

222001–222100 

|-bgcolor=#E9E9E9
| 222001 || 1998 HU || — || April 17, 1998 || Kitt Peak || Spacewatch || CLO || align=right | 3.6 km || 
|-id=002 bgcolor=#d6d6d6
| 222002 ||  || — || April 17, 1998 || Kitt Peak || Spacewatch || HIL3:2 || align=right | 8.2 km || 
|-id=003 bgcolor=#E9E9E9
| 222003 ||  || — || April 21, 1998 || Socorro || LINEAR || MIT || align=right | 3.7 km || 
|-id=004 bgcolor=#fefefe
| 222004 ||  || — || June 27, 1998 || Kitt Peak || Spacewatch || V || align=right data-sort-value="0.87" | 870 m || 
|-id=005 bgcolor=#fefefe
| 222005 ||  || — || August 26, 1998 || Kitt Peak || Spacewatch || — || align=right | 1.4 km || 
|-id=006 bgcolor=#d6d6d6
| 222006 ||  || — || August 26, 1998 || Kitt Peak || Spacewatch || — || align=right | 4.2 km || 
|-id=007 bgcolor=#d6d6d6
| 222007 ||  || — || August 26, 1998 || Kitt Peak || Spacewatch || — || align=right | 3.2 km || 
|-id=008 bgcolor=#FFC2E0
| 222008 ||  || — || August 31, 1998 || Socorro || LINEAR || AMO || align=right data-sort-value="0.55" | 550 m || 
|-id=009 bgcolor=#fefefe
| 222009 ||  || — || August 24, 1998 || Socorro || LINEAR || — || align=right | 1.3 km || 
|-id=010 bgcolor=#d6d6d6
| 222010 ||  || — || August 19, 1998 || Socorro || LINEAR || TEL || align=right | 2.9 km || 
|-id=011 bgcolor=#fefefe
| 222011 || 1998 RP || — || September 9, 1998 || Caussols || ODAS || FLO || align=right | 2.5 km || 
|-id=012 bgcolor=#d6d6d6
| 222012 ||  || — || September 13, 1998 || Kitt Peak || Spacewatch || — || align=right | 3.2 km || 
|-id=013 bgcolor=#d6d6d6
| 222013 ||  || — || September 14, 1998 || Socorro || LINEAR || — || align=right | 3.2 km || 
|-id=014 bgcolor=#fefefe
| 222014 ||  || — || September 16, 1998 || Kitt Peak || Spacewatch || NYS || align=right data-sort-value="0.81" | 810 m || 
|-id=015 bgcolor=#fefefe
| 222015 ||  || — || September 20, 1998 || Kitt Peak || Spacewatch || V || align=right data-sort-value="0.76" | 760 m || 
|-id=016 bgcolor=#fefefe
| 222016 ||  || — || September 20, 1998 || Kitt Peak || Spacewatch || — || align=right data-sort-value="0.99" | 990 m || 
|-id=017 bgcolor=#d6d6d6
| 222017 ||  || — || September 23, 1998 || Kitt Peak || Spacewatch || — || align=right | 3.4 km || 
|-id=018 bgcolor=#fefefe
| 222018 ||  || — || September 25, 1998 || Kitt Peak || Spacewatch || V || align=right data-sort-value="0.81" | 810 m || 
|-id=019 bgcolor=#fefefe
| 222019 ||  || — || September 24, 1998 || Kitt Peak || Spacewatch || — || align=right | 1.3 km || 
|-id=020 bgcolor=#d6d6d6
| 222020 ||  || — || September 25, 1998 || Kitt Peak || Spacewatch || — || align=right | 3.3 km || 
|-id=021 bgcolor=#fefefe
| 222021 ||  || — || September 27, 1998 || Kitt Peak || Spacewatch || — || align=right | 1.0 km || 
|-id=022 bgcolor=#d6d6d6
| 222022 ||  || — || September 26, 1998 || Kitt Peak || Spacewatch || — || align=right | 3.5 km || 
|-id=023 bgcolor=#fefefe
| 222023 ||  || — || September 20, 1998 || La Silla || E. W. Elst || — || align=right | 1.4 km || 
|-id=024 bgcolor=#d6d6d6
| 222024 ||  || — || September 26, 1998 || Socorro || LINEAR || EOS || align=right | 3.5 km || 
|-id=025 bgcolor=#d6d6d6
| 222025 ||  || — || September 26, 1998 || Socorro || LINEAR || EUP || align=right | 5.1 km || 
|-id=026 bgcolor=#d6d6d6
| 222026 ||  || — || September 26, 1998 || Socorro || LINEAR || — || align=right | 3.5 km || 
|-id=027 bgcolor=#d6d6d6
| 222027 ||  || — || September 26, 1998 || Socorro || LINEAR || HYG || align=right | 4.6 km || 
|-id=028 bgcolor=#fefefe
| 222028 ||  || — || September 26, 1998 || Socorro || LINEAR || NYS || align=right data-sort-value="0.94" | 940 m || 
|-id=029 bgcolor=#fefefe
| 222029 ||  || — || September 26, 1998 || Socorro || LINEAR || NYS || align=right data-sort-value="0.95" | 950 m || 
|-id=030 bgcolor=#fefefe
| 222030 ||  || — || September 26, 1998 || Socorro || LINEAR || — || align=right | 1.4 km || 
|-id=031 bgcolor=#fefefe
| 222031 ||  || — || September 26, 1998 || Socorro || LINEAR || NYS || align=right data-sort-value="0.96" | 960 m || 
|-id=032 bgcolor=#d6d6d6
| 222032 Lupton ||  ||  || September 19, 1998 || Apache Point || SDSS || — || align=right | 2.7 km || 
|-id=033 bgcolor=#d6d6d6
| 222033 ||  || — || October 13, 1998 || Caussols || ODAS || — || align=right | 4.1 km || 
|-id=034 bgcolor=#fefefe
| 222034 ||  || — || October 13, 1998 || Caussols || ODAS || NYS || align=right data-sort-value="0.93" | 930 m || 
|-id=035 bgcolor=#fefefe
| 222035 ||  || — || October 12, 1998 || Kitt Peak || Spacewatch || EUT || align=right data-sort-value="0.93" | 930 m || 
|-id=036 bgcolor=#fefefe
| 222036 ||  || — || October 13, 1998 || Kitt Peak || Spacewatch || MAS || align=right data-sort-value="0.95" | 950 m || 
|-id=037 bgcolor=#d6d6d6
| 222037 ||  || — || October 13, 1998 || Kitt Peak || Spacewatch || HYG || align=right | 4.8 km || 
|-id=038 bgcolor=#d6d6d6
| 222038 ||  || — || October 13, 1998 || Kitt Peak || Spacewatch || EOS || align=right | 3.6 km || 
|-id=039 bgcolor=#fefefe
| 222039 ||  || — || October 13, 1998 || Kitt Peak || Spacewatch || — || align=right | 1.2 km || 
|-id=040 bgcolor=#d6d6d6
| 222040 ||  || — || October 14, 1998 || Kitt Peak || Spacewatch || — || align=right | 3.4 km || 
|-id=041 bgcolor=#fefefe
| 222041 ||  || — || October 20, 1998 || Caussols || ODAS || — || align=right | 1.0 km || 
|-id=042 bgcolor=#d6d6d6
| 222042 ||  || — || October 16, 1998 || Kitt Peak || Spacewatch || EOS || align=right | 2.9 km || 
|-id=043 bgcolor=#d6d6d6
| 222043 ||  || — || October 18, 1998 || Kitt Peak || Spacewatch || — || align=right | 4.7 km || 
|-id=044 bgcolor=#fefefe
| 222044 ||  || — || October 18, 1998 || La Silla || E. W. Elst || — || align=right | 1.0 km || 
|-id=045 bgcolor=#fefefe
| 222045 ||  || — || October 28, 1998 || Socorro || LINEAR || NYS || align=right data-sort-value="0.98" | 980 m || 
|-id=046 bgcolor=#fefefe
| 222046 ||  || — || October 16, 1998 || Kitt Peak || Spacewatch || NYS || align=right data-sort-value="0.91" | 910 m || 
|-id=047 bgcolor=#fefefe
| 222047 ||  || — || October 24, 1998 || Kitt Peak || Spacewatch || NYS || align=right | 2.0 km || 
|-id=048 bgcolor=#fefefe
| 222048 ||  || — || October 28, 1998 || Kitt Peak || Spacewatch || — || align=right | 1.2 km || 
|-id=049 bgcolor=#C2FFFF
| 222049 ||  || — || October 18, 1998 || Kitt Peak || Spacewatch || L4 || align=right | 13 km || 
|-id=050 bgcolor=#fefefe
| 222050 ||  || — || November 9, 1998 || Caussols || ODAS || NYS || align=right data-sort-value="0.88" | 880 m || 
|-id=051 bgcolor=#fefefe
| 222051 ||  || — || November 10, 1998 || Caussols || ODAS || MAS || align=right data-sort-value="0.87" | 870 m || 
|-id=052 bgcolor=#d6d6d6
| 222052 ||  || — || November 10, 1998 || Socorro || LINEAR || MEL || align=right | 3.9 km || 
|-id=053 bgcolor=#d6d6d6
| 222053 ||  || — || November 11, 1998 || Socorro || LINEAR || — || align=right | 4.4 km || 
|-id=054 bgcolor=#d6d6d6
| 222054 ||  || — || November 17, 1998 || Caussols || ODAS || — || align=right | 6.1 km || 
|-id=055 bgcolor=#d6d6d6
| 222055 ||  || — || November 18, 1998 || Gekko || T. Kagawa || — || align=right | 8.2 km || 
|-id=056 bgcolor=#C2FFFF
| 222056 ||  || — || November 18, 1998 || Kitt Peak || M. W. Buie || L4 || align=right | 9.2 km || 
|-id=057 bgcolor=#d6d6d6
| 222057 ||  || — || November 16, 1998 || Kitt Peak || Spacewatch || — || align=right | 4.8 km || 
|-id=058 bgcolor=#fefefe
| 222058 ||  || — || November 19, 1998 || Kitt Peak || Spacewatch || — || align=right | 1.1 km || 
|-id=059 bgcolor=#d6d6d6
| 222059 ||  || — || November 21, 1998 || Kitt Peak || Spacewatch || EOS || align=right | 2.9 km || 
|-id=060 bgcolor=#d6d6d6
| 222060 ||  || — || November 21, 1998 || Kitt Peak || Spacewatch || — || align=right | 5.0 km || 
|-id=061 bgcolor=#fefefe
| 222061 ||  || — || December 8, 1998 || Kitt Peak || Spacewatch || MAS || align=right | 1.1 km || 
|-id=062 bgcolor=#fefefe
| 222062 ||  || — || December 8, 1998 || Kitt Peak || Spacewatch || CHL || align=right | 2.8 km || 
|-id=063 bgcolor=#C2FFFF
| 222063 ||  || — || December 8, 1998 || Kitt Peak || Spacewatch || L4 || align=right | 12 km || 
|-id=064 bgcolor=#d6d6d6
| 222064 ||  || — || December 12, 1998 || Kitt Peak || Spacewatch || — || align=right | 4.4 km || 
|-id=065 bgcolor=#d6d6d6
| 222065 ||  || — || December 11, 1998 || Kitt Peak || Spacewatch || HYG || align=right | 4.3 km || 
|-id=066 bgcolor=#d6d6d6
| 222066 ||  || — || December 15, 1998 || Socorro || LINEAR || — || align=right | 8.8 km || 
|-id=067 bgcolor=#d6d6d6
| 222067 ||  || — || January 14, 1999 || Catalina || CSS || EUP || align=right | 9.9 km || 
|-id=068 bgcolor=#E9E9E9
| 222068 ||  || — || March 6, 1999 || Kitt Peak || Spacewatch || — || align=right | 2.3 km || 
|-id=069 bgcolor=#E9E9E9
| 222069 ||  || — || March 21, 1999 || Apache Point || SDSS || — || align=right | 2.1 km || 
|-id=070 bgcolor=#E9E9E9
| 222070 ||  || — || April 11, 1999 || Kitt Peak || Spacewatch || — || align=right | 1.2 km || 
|-id=071 bgcolor=#E9E9E9
| 222071 ||  || — || April 12, 1999 || Kitt Peak || Spacewatch || — || align=right | 4.3 km || 
|-id=072 bgcolor=#E9E9E9
| 222072 ||  || — || April 15, 1999 || Socorro || LINEAR || — || align=right | 2.1 km || 
|-id=073 bgcolor=#FFC2E0
| 222073 ||  || — || April 20, 1999 || Socorro || LINEAR || AMO +1km || align=right data-sort-value="0.89" | 890 m || 
|-id=074 bgcolor=#E9E9E9
| 222074 ||  || — || May 10, 1999 || Socorro || LINEAR || — || align=right | 3.0 km || 
|-id=075 bgcolor=#E9E9E9
| 222075 ||  || — || May 13, 1999 || Socorro || LINEAR || — || align=right | 3.5 km || 
|-id=076 bgcolor=#E9E9E9
| 222076 ||  || — || May 16, 1999 || Kitt Peak || Spacewatch || — || align=right | 3.5 km || 
|-id=077 bgcolor=#E9E9E9
| 222077 ||  || — || May 17, 1999 || Socorro || LINEAR || ADE || align=right | 4.8 km || 
|-id=078 bgcolor=#E9E9E9
| 222078 ||  || — || May 18, 1999 || Socorro || LINEAR || — || align=right | 3.0 km || 
|-id=079 bgcolor=#FA8072
| 222079 ||  || — || July 13, 1999 || Socorro || LINEAR || — || align=right | 1.1 km || 
|-id=080 bgcolor=#d6d6d6
| 222080 ||  || — || September 7, 1999 || Socorro || LINEAR || — || align=right | 2.7 km || 
|-id=081 bgcolor=#fefefe
| 222081 ||  || — || September 7, 1999 || Socorro || LINEAR || — || align=right | 1.1 km || 
|-id=082 bgcolor=#fefefe
| 222082 ||  || — || September 7, 1999 || Socorro || LINEAR || — || align=right | 1.1 km || 
|-id=083 bgcolor=#fefefe
| 222083 ||  || — || September 8, 1999 || Socorro || LINEAR || FLO || align=right | 1.0 km || 
|-id=084 bgcolor=#fefefe
| 222084 ||  || — || September 9, 1999 || Socorro || LINEAR || FLO || align=right data-sort-value="0.84" | 840 m || 
|-id=085 bgcolor=#fefefe
| 222085 ||  || — || September 9, 1999 || Socorro || LINEAR || — || align=right | 1.3 km || 
|-id=086 bgcolor=#fefefe
| 222086 ||  || — || September 9, 1999 || Socorro || LINEAR || FLO || align=right data-sort-value="0.78" | 780 m || 
|-id=087 bgcolor=#fefefe
| 222087 ||  || — || September 4, 1999 || Anderson Mesa || LONEOS || — || align=right data-sort-value="0.97" | 970 m || 
|-id=088 bgcolor=#fefefe
| 222088 ||  || — || October 3, 1999 || Kitt Peak || Spacewatch || — || align=right data-sort-value="0.94" | 940 m || 
|-id=089 bgcolor=#d6d6d6
| 222089 ||  || — || October 4, 1999 || Kitt Peak || Spacewatch || KOR || align=right | 1.6 km || 
|-id=090 bgcolor=#d6d6d6
| 222090 ||  || — || October 4, 1999 || Kitt Peak || Spacewatch || KOR || align=right | 1.7 km || 
|-id=091 bgcolor=#d6d6d6
| 222091 ||  || — || October 4, 1999 || Kitt Peak || Spacewatch || — || align=right | 4.0 km || 
|-id=092 bgcolor=#fefefe
| 222092 ||  || — || October 4, 1999 || Socorro || LINEAR || FLO || align=right data-sort-value="0.92" | 920 m || 
|-id=093 bgcolor=#fefefe
| 222093 ||  || — || October 6, 1999 || Socorro || LINEAR || FLO || align=right data-sort-value="0.95" | 950 m || 
|-id=094 bgcolor=#d6d6d6
| 222094 ||  || — || October 6, 1999 || Socorro || LINEAR || — || align=right | 3.5 km || 
|-id=095 bgcolor=#fefefe
| 222095 ||  || — || October 6, 1999 || Socorro || LINEAR || — || align=right | 1.4 km || 
|-id=096 bgcolor=#d6d6d6
| 222096 ||  || — || October 15, 1999 || Socorro || LINEAR || — || align=right | 3.7 km || 
|-id=097 bgcolor=#fefefe
| 222097 ||  || — || October 9, 1999 || Socorro || LINEAR || H || align=right data-sort-value="0.93" | 930 m || 
|-id=098 bgcolor=#fefefe
| 222098 ||  || — || October 10, 1999 || Socorro || LINEAR || — || align=right | 1.1 km || 
|-id=099 bgcolor=#d6d6d6
| 222099 ||  || — || October 10, 1999 || Socorro || LINEAR || — || align=right | 2.6 km || 
|-id=100 bgcolor=#fefefe
| 222100 ||  || — || October 10, 1999 || Socorro || LINEAR || FLO || align=right | 2.5 km || 
|}

222101–222200 

|-bgcolor=#fefefe
| 222101 ||  || — || October 13, 1999 || Socorro || LINEAR || — || align=right | 1.1 km || 
|-id=102 bgcolor=#fefefe
| 222102 ||  || — || October 13, 1999 || Socorro || LINEAR || FLO || align=right data-sort-value="0.79" | 790 m || 
|-id=103 bgcolor=#fefefe
| 222103 ||  || — || October 14, 1999 || Socorro || LINEAR || H || align=right | 1.1 km || 
|-id=104 bgcolor=#fefefe
| 222104 ||  || — || October 10, 1999 || Socorro || LINEAR || — || align=right | 1.5 km || 
|-id=105 bgcolor=#d6d6d6
| 222105 ||  || — || October 11, 1999 || Kitt Peak || Spacewatch || — || align=right | 3.9 km || 
|-id=106 bgcolor=#fefefe
| 222106 ||  || — || October 9, 1999 || Socorro || LINEAR || — || align=right data-sort-value="0.97" | 970 m || 
|-id=107 bgcolor=#fefefe
| 222107 ||  || — || October 3, 1999 || Socorro || LINEAR || — || align=right | 1.0 km || 
|-id=108 bgcolor=#d6d6d6
| 222108 ||  || — || October 10, 1999 || Socorro || LINEAR || LAU || align=right | 1.5 km || 
|-id=109 bgcolor=#d6d6d6
| 222109 ||  || — || October 2, 1999 || Kitt Peak || Spacewatch || — || align=right | 3.0 km || 
|-id=110 bgcolor=#d6d6d6
| 222110 ||  || — || October 29, 1999 || Kitt Peak || Spacewatch || EOS || align=right | 2.8 km || 
|-id=111 bgcolor=#d6d6d6
| 222111 ||  || — || October 31, 1999 || Kitt Peak || Spacewatch || — || align=right | 4.0 km || 
|-id=112 bgcolor=#d6d6d6
| 222112 ||  || — || October 30, 1999 || Kitt Peak || Spacewatch || KOR || align=right | 1.6 km || 
|-id=113 bgcolor=#fefefe
| 222113 ||  || — || October 30, 1999 || Kitt Peak || Spacewatch || — || align=right data-sort-value="0.68" | 680 m || 
|-id=114 bgcolor=#d6d6d6
| 222114 ||  || — || October 31, 1999 || Kitt Peak || Spacewatch || — || align=right | 2.6 km || 
|-id=115 bgcolor=#fefefe
| 222115 ||  || — || October 31, 1999 || Kitt Peak || Spacewatch || FLO || align=right data-sort-value="0.65" | 650 m || 
|-id=116 bgcolor=#d6d6d6
| 222116 ||  || — || October 31, 1999 || Kitt Peak || Spacewatch || — || align=right | 2.2 km || 
|-id=117 bgcolor=#d6d6d6
| 222117 ||  || — || October 31, 1999 || Kitt Peak || Spacewatch || KOR || align=right | 1.7 km || 
|-id=118 bgcolor=#fefefe
| 222118 ||  || — || October 16, 1999 || Kitt Peak || Spacewatch || — || align=right data-sort-value="0.97" | 970 m || 
|-id=119 bgcolor=#d6d6d6
| 222119 ||  || — || October 16, 1999 || Kitt Peak || Spacewatch || KOR || align=right | 1.5 km || 
|-id=120 bgcolor=#d6d6d6
| 222120 ||  || — || October 29, 1999 || Catalina || CSS || EOS || align=right | 3.3 km || 
|-id=121 bgcolor=#fefefe
| 222121 ||  || — || November 3, 1999 || Socorro || LINEAR || FLO || align=right | 1.4 km || 
|-id=122 bgcolor=#fefefe
| 222122 ||  || — || November 4, 1999 || Socorro || LINEAR || — || align=right data-sort-value="0.90" | 900 m || 
|-id=123 bgcolor=#d6d6d6
| 222123 ||  || — || November 4, 1999 || Socorro || LINEAR || — || align=right | 3.6 km || 
|-id=124 bgcolor=#fefefe
| 222124 ||  || — || November 4, 1999 || Socorro || LINEAR || FLO || align=right data-sort-value="0.79" | 790 m || 
|-id=125 bgcolor=#fefefe
| 222125 ||  || — || November 5, 1999 || Kitt Peak || Spacewatch || V || align=right data-sort-value="0.59" | 590 m || 
|-id=126 bgcolor=#fefefe
| 222126 ||  || — || November 4, 1999 || Socorro || LINEAR || — || align=right | 1.4 km || 
|-id=127 bgcolor=#d6d6d6
| 222127 ||  || — || November 4, 1999 || Socorro || LINEAR || EOS || align=right | 3.4 km || 
|-id=128 bgcolor=#fefefe
| 222128 ||  || — || November 4, 1999 || Socorro || LINEAR || — || align=right | 1.2 km || 
|-id=129 bgcolor=#d6d6d6
| 222129 ||  || — || November 9, 1999 || Socorro || LINEAR || — || align=right | 3.1 km || 
|-id=130 bgcolor=#fefefe
| 222130 ||  || — || November 9, 1999 || Socorro || LINEAR || FLO || align=right data-sort-value="0.92" | 920 m || 
|-id=131 bgcolor=#fefefe
| 222131 ||  || — || November 9, 1999 || Socorro || LINEAR || — || align=right | 1.0 km || 
|-id=132 bgcolor=#d6d6d6
| 222132 ||  || — || November 9, 1999 || Socorro || LINEAR || — || align=right | 4.9 km || 
|-id=133 bgcolor=#fefefe
| 222133 ||  || — || November 9, 1999 || Socorro || LINEAR || FLO || align=right data-sort-value="0.90" | 900 m || 
|-id=134 bgcolor=#C2FFFF
| 222134 ||  || — || November 9, 1999 || Socorro || LINEAR || L4 || align=right | 15 km || 
|-id=135 bgcolor=#d6d6d6
| 222135 ||  || — || November 5, 1999 || Kitt Peak || Spacewatch || KOR || align=right | 1.6 km || 
|-id=136 bgcolor=#fefefe
| 222136 ||  || — || November 9, 1999 || Kitt Peak || Spacewatch || — || align=right | 1.0 km || 
|-id=137 bgcolor=#fefefe
| 222137 ||  || — || November 9, 1999 || Socorro || LINEAR || FLO || align=right | 1.5 km || 
|-id=138 bgcolor=#fefefe
| 222138 ||  || — || November 14, 1999 || Socorro || LINEAR || — || align=right | 1.1 km || 
|-id=139 bgcolor=#d6d6d6
| 222139 ||  || — || November 14, 1999 || Socorro || LINEAR || KOR || align=right | 2.1 km || 
|-id=140 bgcolor=#fefefe
| 222140 ||  || — || November 14, 1999 || Socorro || LINEAR || — || align=right | 1.1 km || 
|-id=141 bgcolor=#fefefe
| 222141 ||  || — || November 14, 1999 || Kitt Peak || Spacewatch || — || align=right | 1.7 km || 
|-id=142 bgcolor=#d6d6d6
| 222142 ||  || — || November 12, 1999 || Socorro || LINEAR || — || align=right | 2.6 km || 
|-id=143 bgcolor=#fefefe
| 222143 ||  || — || November 28, 1999 || Kitt Peak || Spacewatch || NYS || align=right data-sort-value="0.92" | 920 m || 
|-id=144 bgcolor=#d6d6d6
| 222144 ||  || — || November 29, 1999 || Kitt Peak || Spacewatch || ITH || align=right | 2.0 km || 
|-id=145 bgcolor=#fefefe
| 222145 ||  || — || December 6, 1999 || Socorro || LINEAR || PHO || align=right | 1.7 km || 
|-id=146 bgcolor=#fefefe
| 222146 ||  || — || December 7, 1999 || Socorro || LINEAR || FLO || align=right data-sort-value="0.84" | 840 m || 
|-id=147 bgcolor=#fefefe
| 222147 ||  || — || December 7, 1999 || Socorro || LINEAR || — || align=right | 1.3 km || 
|-id=148 bgcolor=#d6d6d6
| 222148 ||  || — || December 7, 1999 || Socorro || LINEAR || EOS || align=right | 2.7 km || 
|-id=149 bgcolor=#d6d6d6
| 222149 ||  || — || December 7, 1999 || Socorro || LINEAR || — || align=right | 3.5 km || 
|-id=150 bgcolor=#d6d6d6
| 222150 ||  || — || December 12, 1999 || Socorro || LINEAR || — || align=right | 3.1 km || 
|-id=151 bgcolor=#FA8072
| 222151 ||  || — || December 15, 1999 || Socorro || LINEAR || H || align=right | 1.1 km || 
|-id=152 bgcolor=#d6d6d6
| 222152 ||  || — || December 12, 1999 || Socorro || LINEAR || — || align=right | 4.6 km || 
|-id=153 bgcolor=#fefefe
| 222153 ||  || — || December 12, 1999 || Socorro || LINEAR || FLO || align=right | 1.2 km || 
|-id=154 bgcolor=#d6d6d6
| 222154 ||  || — || December 13, 1999 || Socorro || LINEAR || — || align=right | 4.3 km || 
|-id=155 bgcolor=#d6d6d6
| 222155 ||  || — || December 14, 1999 || Kitt Peak || Spacewatch || — || align=right | 3.2 km || 
|-id=156 bgcolor=#d6d6d6
| 222156 ||  || — || December 8, 1999 || Socorro || LINEAR || — || align=right | 4.8 km || 
|-id=157 bgcolor=#fefefe
| 222157 ||  || — || December 19, 1999 || Socorro || LINEAR || PHO || align=right | 1.4 km || 
|-id=158 bgcolor=#fefefe
| 222158 ||  || — || December 27, 1999 || Kitt Peak || Spacewatch || — || align=right data-sort-value="0.98" | 980 m || 
|-id=159 bgcolor=#fefefe
| 222159 ||  || — || January 2, 2000 || Socorro || LINEAR || — || align=right | 1.1 km || 
|-id=160 bgcolor=#d6d6d6
| 222160 ||  || — || January 3, 2000 || Socorro || LINEAR || JLI || align=right | 3.0 km || 
|-id=161 bgcolor=#d6d6d6
| 222161 ||  || — || January 3, 2000 || Socorro || LINEAR || — || align=right | 5.5 km || 
|-id=162 bgcolor=#d6d6d6
| 222162 ||  || — || January 3, 2000 || Socorro || LINEAR || — || align=right | 4.6 km || 
|-id=163 bgcolor=#d6d6d6
| 222163 ||  || — || January 4, 2000 || Socorro || LINEAR || — || align=right | 5.0 km || 
|-id=164 bgcolor=#d6d6d6
| 222164 ||  || — || January 4, 2000 || Socorro || LINEAR || — || align=right | 3.5 km || 
|-id=165 bgcolor=#FFC2E0
| 222165 ||  || — || January 5, 2000 || Socorro || LINEAR || AMO +1km || align=right | 1.0 km || 
|-id=166 bgcolor=#d6d6d6
| 222166 ||  || — || January 5, 2000 || Socorro || LINEAR || — || align=right | 5.0 km || 
|-id=167 bgcolor=#d6d6d6
| 222167 ||  || — || January 5, 2000 || Socorro || LINEAR || EOS || align=right | 2.9 km || 
|-id=168 bgcolor=#d6d6d6
| 222168 ||  || — || January 5, 2000 || Socorro || LINEAR || — || align=right | 6.5 km || 
|-id=169 bgcolor=#fefefe
| 222169 ||  || — || January 8, 2000 || Socorro || LINEAR || H || align=right data-sort-value="0.89" | 890 m || 
|-id=170 bgcolor=#d6d6d6
| 222170 ||  || — || January 7, 2000 || Socorro || LINEAR || — || align=right | 5.0 km || 
|-id=171 bgcolor=#d6d6d6
| 222171 ||  || — || January 4, 2000 || Kitt Peak || Spacewatch || LIX || align=right | 7.5 km || 
|-id=172 bgcolor=#d6d6d6
| 222172 ||  || — || January 7, 2000 || Kitt Peak || Spacewatch || — || align=right | 3.2 km || 
|-id=173 bgcolor=#d6d6d6
| 222173 ||  || — || January 5, 2000 || Kitt Peak || Spacewatch || HYG || align=right | 3.9 km || 
|-id=174 bgcolor=#fefefe
| 222174 ||  || — || January 30, 2000 || Socorro || LINEAR || — || align=right | 1.2 km || 
|-id=175 bgcolor=#d6d6d6
| 222175 ||  || — || January 29, 2000 || Socorro || LINEAR || — || align=right | 5.4 km || 
|-id=176 bgcolor=#d6d6d6
| 222176 ||  || — || January 29, 2000 || Socorro || LINEAR || — || align=right | 4.7 km || 
|-id=177 bgcolor=#fefefe
| 222177 ||  || — || January 27, 2000 || Višnjan Observatory || K. Korlević || — || align=right | 1.2 km || 
|-id=178 bgcolor=#fefefe
| 222178 ||  || — || January 29, 2000 || Kitt Peak || Spacewatch || MAS || align=right | 1.2 km || 
|-id=179 bgcolor=#d6d6d6
| 222179 ||  || — || January 29, 2000 || Catalina || CSS || EUP || align=right | 7.8 km || 
|-id=180 bgcolor=#d6d6d6
| 222180 ||  || — || February 2, 2000 || Socorro || LINEAR || — || align=right | 5.0 km || 
|-id=181 bgcolor=#d6d6d6
| 222181 ||  || — || February 2, 2000 || Socorro || LINEAR || URS || align=right | 4.9 km || 
|-id=182 bgcolor=#fefefe
| 222182 ||  || — || February 2, 2000 || Socorro || LINEAR || — || align=right | 1.4 km || 
|-id=183 bgcolor=#d6d6d6
| 222183 ||  || — || February 2, 2000 || Socorro || LINEAR || — || align=right | 3.9 km || 
|-id=184 bgcolor=#fefefe
| 222184 ||  || — || February 1, 2000 || Kitt Peak || Spacewatch || MAS || align=right data-sort-value="0.89" | 890 m || 
|-id=185 bgcolor=#fefefe
| 222185 ||  || — || February 2, 2000 || Socorro || LINEAR || — || align=right data-sort-value="0.78" | 780 m || 
|-id=186 bgcolor=#fefefe
| 222186 ||  || — || February 8, 2000 || Kitt Peak || Spacewatch || V || align=right data-sort-value="0.93" | 930 m || 
|-id=187 bgcolor=#d6d6d6
| 222187 ||  || — || February 4, 2000 || Socorro || LINEAR || — || align=right | 12 km || 
|-id=188 bgcolor=#d6d6d6
| 222188 ||  || — || February 11, 2000 || Socorro || LINEAR || — || align=right | 4.3 km || 
|-id=189 bgcolor=#d6d6d6
| 222189 ||  || — || February 3, 2000 || Kitt Peak || Spacewatch || THM || align=right | 3.4 km || 
|-id=190 bgcolor=#fefefe
| 222190 ||  || — || February 26, 2000 || Socorro || LINEAR || PHO || align=right | 1.4 km || 
|-id=191 bgcolor=#fefefe
| 222191 ||  || — || February 29, 2000 || Socorro || LINEAR || NYS || align=right data-sort-value="0.84" | 840 m || 
|-id=192 bgcolor=#d6d6d6
| 222192 ||  || — || February 29, 2000 || Socorro || LINEAR || HYG || align=right | 4.0 km || 
|-id=193 bgcolor=#d6d6d6
| 222193 ||  || — || February 29, 2000 || Socorro || LINEAR || — || align=right | 6.1 km || 
|-id=194 bgcolor=#fefefe
| 222194 ||  || — || February 29, 2000 || Socorro || LINEAR || — || align=right | 1.2 km || 
|-id=195 bgcolor=#d6d6d6
| 222195 ||  || — || February 29, 2000 || Socorro || LINEAR || HYG || align=right | 4.6 km || 
|-id=196 bgcolor=#d6d6d6
| 222196 ||  || — || February 29, 2000 || Socorro || LINEAR || — || align=right | 5.4 km || 
|-id=197 bgcolor=#d6d6d6
| 222197 ||  || — || February 28, 2000 || Socorro || LINEAR || — || align=right | 6.0 km || 
|-id=198 bgcolor=#d6d6d6
| 222198 ||  || — || February 29, 2000 || Socorro || LINEAR || — || align=right | 5.3 km || 
|-id=199 bgcolor=#d6d6d6
| 222199 ||  || — || February 26, 2000 || Kitt Peak || Spacewatch || HYG || align=right | 3.8 km || 
|-id=200 bgcolor=#fefefe
| 222200 ||  || — || February 29, 2000 || Socorro || LINEAR || — || align=right | 1.4 km || 
|}

222201–222300 

|-bgcolor=#fefefe
| 222201 ||  || — || February 29, 2000 || Socorro || LINEAR || — || align=right | 1.2 km || 
|-id=202 bgcolor=#fefefe
| 222202 ||  || — || February 29, 2000 || Socorro || LINEAR || — || align=right | 1.4 km || 
|-id=203 bgcolor=#fefefe
| 222203 ||  || — || February 27, 2000 || Kitt Peak || Spacewatch || NYS || align=right data-sort-value="0.92" | 920 m || 
|-id=204 bgcolor=#d6d6d6
| 222204 ||  || — || February 26, 2000 || Kitt Peak || Spacewatch || — || align=right | 4.6 km || 
|-id=205 bgcolor=#FA8072
| 222205 ||  || — || February 25, 2000 || Kitt Peak || Spacewatch || — || align=right | 1.4 km || 
|-id=206 bgcolor=#fefefe
| 222206 ||  || — || March 3, 2000 || Socorro || LINEAR || NYS || align=right | 1.2 km || 
|-id=207 bgcolor=#fefefe
| 222207 ||  || — || March 3, 2000 || Socorro || LINEAR || NYS || align=right data-sort-value="0.68" | 680 m || 
|-id=208 bgcolor=#fefefe
| 222208 ||  || — || March 8, 2000 || Socorro || LINEAR || EUT || align=right | 1.0 km || 
|-id=209 bgcolor=#d6d6d6
| 222209 ||  || — || March 9, 2000 || Socorro || LINEAR || — || align=right | 4.7 km || 
|-id=210 bgcolor=#fefefe
| 222210 ||  || — || March 10, 2000 || Socorro || LINEAR || — || align=right data-sort-value="0.96" | 960 m || 
|-id=211 bgcolor=#fefefe
| 222211 ||  || — || March 11, 2000 || Socorro || LINEAR || NYS || align=right data-sort-value="0.92" | 920 m || 
|-id=212 bgcolor=#fefefe
| 222212 ||  || — || March 12, 2000 || Kitt Peak || Spacewatch || MAS || align=right data-sort-value="0.69" | 690 m || 
|-id=213 bgcolor=#fefefe
| 222213 ||  || — || March 12, 2000 || Kitt Peak || Spacewatch || — || align=right data-sort-value="0.92" | 920 m || 
|-id=214 bgcolor=#fefefe
| 222214 ||  || — || March 14, 2000 || Kitt Peak || Spacewatch || — || align=right | 1.0 km || 
|-id=215 bgcolor=#d6d6d6
| 222215 ||  || — || March 11, 2000 || Catalina || CSS || EUP || align=right | 5.6 km || 
|-id=216 bgcolor=#d6d6d6
| 222216 ||  || — || March 3, 2000 || Socorro || LINEAR || — || align=right | 2.7 km || 
|-id=217 bgcolor=#d6d6d6
| 222217 ||  || — || March 4, 2000 || Socorro || LINEAR || — || align=right | 4.8 km || 
|-id=218 bgcolor=#d6d6d6
| 222218 ||  || — || March 4, 2000 || Socorro || LINEAR || — || align=right | 5.6 km || 
|-id=219 bgcolor=#fefefe
| 222219 ||  || — || March 25, 2000 || Kitt Peak || Spacewatch || NYS || align=right data-sort-value="0.85" | 850 m || 
|-id=220 bgcolor=#fefefe
| 222220 ||  || — || March 25, 2000 || Kitt Peak || Spacewatch || H || align=right | 1.1 km || 
|-id=221 bgcolor=#fefefe
| 222221 ||  || — || March 30, 2000 || Kitt Peak || Spacewatch || PHO || align=right | 1.5 km || 
|-id=222 bgcolor=#fefefe
| 222222 ||  || — || March 29, 2000 || Socorro || LINEAR || — || align=right | 1.9 km || 
|-id=223 bgcolor=#d6d6d6
| 222223 ||  || — || March 29, 2000 || Socorro || LINEAR || — || align=right | 6.4 km || 
|-id=224 bgcolor=#fefefe
| 222224 ||  || — || March 28, 2000 || Socorro || LINEAR || NYS || align=right | 1.2 km || 
|-id=225 bgcolor=#d6d6d6
| 222225 ||  || — || March 29, 2000 || Socorro || LINEAR || TIR || align=right | 3.9 km || 
|-id=226 bgcolor=#fefefe
| 222226 ||  || — || March 29, 2000 || Socorro || LINEAR || — || align=right | 1.5 km || 
|-id=227 bgcolor=#fefefe
| 222227 || 2000 GH || — || April 1, 2000 || Kitt Peak || Spacewatch || NYS || align=right data-sort-value="0.94" | 940 m || 
|-id=228 bgcolor=#d6d6d6
| 222228 ||  || — || April 4, 2000 || Socorro || LINEAR || EUP || align=right | 7.1 km || 
|-id=229 bgcolor=#fefefe
| 222229 ||  || — || April 5, 2000 || Socorro || LINEAR || MAS || align=right | 1.4 km || 
|-id=230 bgcolor=#fefefe
| 222230 ||  || — || April 5, 2000 || Socorro || LINEAR || ERI || align=right | 2.7 km || 
|-id=231 bgcolor=#fefefe
| 222231 ||  || — || April 2, 2000 || Kitt Peak || Spacewatch || MAS || align=right data-sort-value="0.94" | 940 m || 
|-id=232 bgcolor=#fefefe
| 222232 ||  || — || April 2, 2000 || Kitt Peak || Spacewatch || — || align=right | 1.2 km || 
|-id=233 bgcolor=#fefefe
| 222233 ||  || — || April 3, 2000 || Kitt Peak || Spacewatch || — || align=right | 1.0 km || 
|-id=234 bgcolor=#E9E9E9
| 222234 ||  || — || April 12, 2000 || Prescott || P. G. Comba || JUN || align=right | 1.7 km || 
|-id=235 bgcolor=#fefefe
| 222235 ||  || — || April 5, 2000 || Kitt Peak || Spacewatch || — || align=right | 3.2 km || 
|-id=236 bgcolor=#fefefe
| 222236 ||  || — || April 2, 2000 || Anderson Mesa || LONEOS || — || align=right | 1.5 km || 
|-id=237 bgcolor=#fefefe
| 222237 ||  || — || April 3, 2000 || Anderson Mesa || LONEOS || MAS || align=right data-sort-value="0.96" | 960 m || 
|-id=238 bgcolor=#fefefe
| 222238 ||  || — || April 24, 2000 || Kitt Peak || Spacewatch || MAS || align=right | 1.1 km || 
|-id=239 bgcolor=#fefefe
| 222239 ||  || — || April 29, 2000 || Socorro || LINEAR || PHO || align=right | 1.4 km || 
|-id=240 bgcolor=#d6d6d6
| 222240 ||  || — || April 30, 2000 || Anderson Mesa || LONEOS || Tj (2.95) || align=right | 8.8 km || 
|-id=241 bgcolor=#d6d6d6
| 222241 ||  || — || April 30, 2000 || Socorro || LINEAR || EUP || align=right | 11 km || 
|-id=242 bgcolor=#fefefe
| 222242 ||  || — || May 7, 2000 || Socorro || LINEAR || — || align=right | 1.4 km || 
|-id=243 bgcolor=#fefefe
| 222243 ||  || — || May 28, 2000 || Socorro || LINEAR || NYS || align=right | 1.1 km || 
|-id=244 bgcolor=#E9E9E9
| 222244 ||  || — || June 8, 2000 || Socorro || LINEAR || EUN || align=right | 2.0 km || 
|-id=245 bgcolor=#E9E9E9
| 222245 ||  || — || June 1, 2000 || Socorro || LINEAR || — || align=right | 2.1 km || 
|-id=246 bgcolor=#E9E9E9
| 222246 ||  || — || July 4, 2000 || Kitt Peak || Spacewatch || — || align=right | 1.4 km || 
|-id=247 bgcolor=#E9E9E9
| 222247 ||  || — || July 30, 2000 || Socorro || LINEAR || — || align=right | 3.8 km || 
|-id=248 bgcolor=#E9E9E9
| 222248 ||  || — || July 29, 2000 || Anderson Mesa || LONEOS || — || align=right | 1.9 km || 
|-id=249 bgcolor=#E9E9E9
| 222249 ||  || — || August 3, 2000 || Kuma Kogen || A. Nakamura || — || align=right | 2.1 km || 
|-id=250 bgcolor=#E9E9E9
| 222250 ||  || — || August 24, 2000 || Socorro || LINEAR || — || align=right | 3.7 km || 
|-id=251 bgcolor=#E9E9E9
| 222251 ||  || — || August 24, 2000 || Socorro || LINEAR || — || align=right | 3.0 km || 
|-id=252 bgcolor=#E9E9E9
| 222252 ||  || — || August 20, 2000 || Anderson Mesa || LONEOS || — || align=right | 4.8 km || 
|-id=253 bgcolor=#E9E9E9
| 222253 ||  || — || August 24, 2000 || Socorro || LINEAR || — || align=right | 2.4 km || 
|-id=254 bgcolor=#E9E9E9
| 222254 ||  || — || August 28, 2000 || Socorro || LINEAR || — || align=right | 2.9 km || 
|-id=255 bgcolor=#E9E9E9
| 222255 ||  || — || August 28, 2000 || Socorro || LINEAR || — || align=right | 1.9 km || 
|-id=256 bgcolor=#E9E9E9
| 222256 ||  || — || August 24, 2000 || Socorro || LINEAR || — || align=right | 3.9 km || 
|-id=257 bgcolor=#E9E9E9
| 222257 ||  || — || August 26, 2000 || Socorro || LINEAR || — || align=right | 1.6 km || 
|-id=258 bgcolor=#E9E9E9
| 222258 ||  || — || August 31, 2000 || Socorro || LINEAR || — || align=right | 2.7 km || 
|-id=259 bgcolor=#E9E9E9
| 222259 ||  || — || August 31, 2000 || Socorro || LINEAR || EUN || align=right | 2.2 km || 
|-id=260 bgcolor=#E9E9E9
| 222260 ||  || — || August 31, 2000 || Socorro || LINEAR || — || align=right | 3.4 km || 
|-id=261 bgcolor=#E9E9E9
| 222261 ||  || — || August 31, 2000 || Socorro || LINEAR || — || align=right | 3.3 km || 
|-id=262 bgcolor=#E9E9E9
| 222262 ||  || — || August 31, 2000 || Socorro || LINEAR || JUN || align=right | 1.7 km || 
|-id=263 bgcolor=#E9E9E9
| 222263 ||  || — || August 31, 2000 || Socorro || LINEAR || — || align=right | 2.8 km || 
|-id=264 bgcolor=#E9E9E9
| 222264 ||  || — || August 31, 2000 || Socorro || LINEAR || — || align=right | 2.3 km || 
|-id=265 bgcolor=#E9E9E9
| 222265 ||  || — || August 24, 2000 || Socorro || LINEAR || — || align=right | 2.4 km || 
|-id=266 bgcolor=#E9E9E9
| 222266 ||  || — || August 29, 2000 || Socorro || LINEAR || EUN || align=right | 2.1 km || 
|-id=267 bgcolor=#E9E9E9
| 222267 ||  || — || August 31, 2000 || Socorro || LINEAR || — || align=right | 3.2 km || 
|-id=268 bgcolor=#E9E9E9
| 222268 ||  || — || September 1, 2000 || Socorro || LINEAR || JUN || align=right | 1.9 km || 
|-id=269 bgcolor=#E9E9E9
| 222269 ||  || — || September 1, 2000 || Socorro || LINEAR || — || align=right | 2.6 km || 
|-id=270 bgcolor=#E9E9E9
| 222270 ||  || — || September 1, 2000 || Socorro || LINEAR || JUN || align=right | 1.4 km || 
|-id=271 bgcolor=#E9E9E9
| 222271 ||  || — || September 5, 2000 || Socorro || LINEAR || — || align=right | 2.6 km || 
|-id=272 bgcolor=#E9E9E9
| 222272 ||  || — || September 7, 2000 || Kitt Peak || Spacewatch || NEM || align=right | 2.9 km || 
|-id=273 bgcolor=#E9E9E9
| 222273 ||  || — || September 1, 2000 || Socorro || LINEAR || — || align=right | 3.9 km || 
|-id=274 bgcolor=#E9E9E9
| 222274 ||  || — || September 1, 2000 || Socorro || LINEAR || — || align=right | 2.4 km || 
|-id=275 bgcolor=#E9E9E9
| 222275 ||  || — || September 5, 2000 || Anderson Mesa || LONEOS || MIT || align=right | 5.6 km || 
|-id=276 bgcolor=#E9E9E9
| 222276 ||  || — || September 22, 2000 || Socorro || LINEAR || — || align=right | 2.7 km || 
|-id=277 bgcolor=#E9E9E9
| 222277 ||  || — || September 24, 2000 || Socorro || LINEAR || — || align=right | 2.8 km || 
|-id=278 bgcolor=#E9E9E9
| 222278 ||  || — || September 24, 2000 || Socorro || LINEAR || JUN || align=right | 1.9 km || 
|-id=279 bgcolor=#E9E9E9
| 222279 ||  || — || September 24, 2000 || Socorro || LINEAR || — || align=right | 3.7 km || 
|-id=280 bgcolor=#E9E9E9
| 222280 ||  || — || September 23, 2000 || Socorro || LINEAR || — || align=right | 3.1 km || 
|-id=281 bgcolor=#E9E9E9
| 222281 ||  || — || September 24, 2000 || Socorro || LINEAR || — || align=right | 3.4 km || 
|-id=282 bgcolor=#E9E9E9
| 222282 ||  || — || September 24, 2000 || Socorro || LINEAR || — || align=right | 2.2 km || 
|-id=283 bgcolor=#E9E9E9
| 222283 ||  || — || September 24, 2000 || Socorro || LINEAR || ADE || align=right | 4.0 km || 
|-id=284 bgcolor=#E9E9E9
| 222284 ||  || — || September 23, 2000 || Socorro || LINEAR || — || align=right | 3.2 km || 
|-id=285 bgcolor=#E9E9E9
| 222285 ||  || — || September 23, 2000 || Socorro || LINEAR || — || align=right | 2.3 km || 
|-id=286 bgcolor=#E9E9E9
| 222286 ||  || — || September 24, 2000 || Socorro || LINEAR || — || align=right | 2.4 km || 
|-id=287 bgcolor=#E9E9E9
| 222287 ||  || — || September 24, 2000 || Socorro || LINEAR || — || align=right | 3.0 km || 
|-id=288 bgcolor=#E9E9E9
| 222288 ||  || — || September 22, 2000 || Socorro || LINEAR || EUN || align=right | 2.1 km || 
|-id=289 bgcolor=#E9E9E9
| 222289 ||  || — || September 23, 2000 || Socorro || LINEAR || — || align=right | 4.3 km || 
|-id=290 bgcolor=#E9E9E9
| 222290 ||  || — || September 24, 2000 || Socorro || LINEAR || — || align=right | 2.9 km || 
|-id=291 bgcolor=#E9E9E9
| 222291 ||  || — || September 24, 2000 || Socorro || LINEAR || — || align=right | 3.5 km || 
|-id=292 bgcolor=#E9E9E9
| 222292 ||  || — || September 23, 2000 || Socorro || LINEAR || — || align=right | 4.3 km || 
|-id=293 bgcolor=#E9E9E9
| 222293 ||  || — || September 23, 2000 || Socorro || LINEAR || — || align=right | 2.1 km || 
|-id=294 bgcolor=#E9E9E9
| 222294 ||  || — || September 28, 2000 || Socorro || LINEAR || — || align=right | 2.4 km || 
|-id=295 bgcolor=#E9E9E9
| 222295 ||  || — || September 24, 2000 || Socorro || LINEAR || — || align=right | 1.9 km || 
|-id=296 bgcolor=#E9E9E9
| 222296 ||  || — || September 25, 2000 || Socorro || LINEAR || — || align=right | 3.2 km || 
|-id=297 bgcolor=#E9E9E9
| 222297 ||  || — || September 24, 2000 || Socorro || LINEAR || XIZ || align=right | 1.9 km || 
|-id=298 bgcolor=#E9E9E9
| 222298 ||  || — || September 24, 2000 || Socorro || LINEAR || — || align=right | 3.0 km || 
|-id=299 bgcolor=#E9E9E9
| 222299 ||  || — || September 24, 2000 || Socorro || LINEAR || NEM || align=right | 4.4 km || 
|-id=300 bgcolor=#E9E9E9
| 222300 ||  || — || September 27, 2000 || Socorro || LINEAR || WIT || align=right | 1.5 km || 
|}

222301–222400 

|-bgcolor=#E9E9E9
| 222301 ||  || — || September 28, 2000 || Socorro || LINEAR || — || align=right | 2.2 km || 
|-id=302 bgcolor=#E9E9E9
| 222302 ||  || — || September 23, 2000 || Socorro || LINEAR || — || align=right | 3.1 km || 
|-id=303 bgcolor=#E9E9E9
| 222303 ||  || — || September 23, 2000 || Socorro || LINEAR || — || align=right | 3.5 km || 
|-id=304 bgcolor=#E9E9E9
| 222304 ||  || — || September 27, 2000 || Socorro || LINEAR || — || align=right | 3.4 km || 
|-id=305 bgcolor=#E9E9E9
| 222305 ||  || — || September 27, 2000 || Socorro || LINEAR || — || align=right | 3.2 km || 
|-id=306 bgcolor=#E9E9E9
| 222306 ||  || — || September 27, 2000 || Socorro || LINEAR || — || align=right | 4.3 km || 
|-id=307 bgcolor=#E9E9E9
| 222307 ||  || — || September 27, 2000 || Socorro || LINEAR || — || align=right | 3.1 km || 
|-id=308 bgcolor=#E9E9E9
| 222308 ||  || — || September 28, 2000 || Socorro || LINEAR || — || align=right | 3.6 km || 
|-id=309 bgcolor=#E9E9E9
| 222309 ||  || — || September 28, 2000 || Socorro || LINEAR || PAD || align=right | 3.4 km || 
|-id=310 bgcolor=#E9E9E9
| 222310 ||  || — || September 28, 2000 || Socorro || LINEAR || — || align=right | 3.8 km || 
|-id=311 bgcolor=#E9E9E9
| 222311 ||  || — || September 30, 2000 || Socorro || LINEAR || — || align=right | 3.8 km || 
|-id=312 bgcolor=#E9E9E9
| 222312 ||  || — || September 22, 2000 || Socorro || LINEAR || — || align=right | 2.9 km || 
|-id=313 bgcolor=#E9E9E9
| 222313 ||  || — || September 29, 2000 || Anderson Mesa || LONEOS || — || align=right | 3.3 km || 
|-id=314 bgcolor=#E9E9E9
| 222314 ||  || — || September 23, 2000 || Anderson Mesa || LONEOS || — || align=right | 2.3 km || 
|-id=315 bgcolor=#E9E9E9
| 222315 ||  || — || September 23, 2000 || Anderson Mesa || LONEOS || — || align=right | 2.2 km || 
|-id=316 bgcolor=#E9E9E9
| 222316 ||  || — || September 24, 2000 || Anderson Mesa || LONEOS || — || align=right | 3.5 km || 
|-id=317 bgcolor=#E9E9E9
| 222317 ||  || — || October 1, 2000 || Socorro || LINEAR || — || align=right | 2.0 km || 
|-id=318 bgcolor=#E9E9E9
| 222318 ||  || — || October 1, 2000 || Socorro || LINEAR || — || align=right | 2.7 km || 
|-id=319 bgcolor=#E9E9E9
| 222319 ||  || — || October 1, 2000 || Socorro || LINEAR || — || align=right | 2.5 km || 
|-id=320 bgcolor=#E9E9E9
| 222320 ||  || — || October 1, 2000 || Socorro || LINEAR || — || align=right | 4.4 km || 
|-id=321 bgcolor=#E9E9E9
| 222321 ||  || — || October 1, 2000 || Anderson Mesa || LONEOS || — || align=right | 2.8 km || 
|-id=322 bgcolor=#E9E9E9
| 222322 ||  || — || October 2, 2000 || Socorro || LINEAR || — || align=right | 2.5 km || 
|-id=323 bgcolor=#E9E9E9
| 222323 ||  || — || October 1, 2000 || Apache Point || SDSS || — || align=right | 2.8 km || 
|-id=324 bgcolor=#E9E9E9
| 222324 ||  || — || October 27, 2000 || Kitt Peak || Spacewatch || — || align=right | 2.9 km || 
|-id=325 bgcolor=#E9E9E9
| 222325 ||  || — || October 27, 2000 || Socorro || LINEAR || EUN || align=right | 2.4 km || 
|-id=326 bgcolor=#E9E9E9
| 222326 ||  || — || October 24, 2000 || Socorro || LINEAR || — || align=right | 3.4 km || 
|-id=327 bgcolor=#E9E9E9
| 222327 ||  || — || October 24, 2000 || Socorro || LINEAR || GEF || align=right | 2.0 km || 
|-id=328 bgcolor=#E9E9E9
| 222328 ||  || — || October 24, 2000 || Socorro || LINEAR || GEF || align=right | 2.1 km || 
|-id=329 bgcolor=#d6d6d6
| 222329 ||  || — || October 25, 2000 || Socorro || LINEAR || — || align=right | 4.5 km || 
|-id=330 bgcolor=#E9E9E9
| 222330 ||  || — || October 25, 2000 || Socorro || LINEAR || — || align=right | 3.4 km || 
|-id=331 bgcolor=#E9E9E9
| 222331 ||  || — || October 25, 2000 || Socorro || LINEAR || — || align=right | 2.8 km || 
|-id=332 bgcolor=#E9E9E9
| 222332 ||  || — || October 25, 2000 || Socorro || LINEAR || — || align=right | 4.8 km || 
|-id=333 bgcolor=#E9E9E9
| 222333 ||  || — || October 24, 2000 || Socorro || LINEAR || — || align=right | 2.0 km || 
|-id=334 bgcolor=#E9E9E9
| 222334 ||  || — || October 24, 2000 || Socorro || LINEAR || — || align=right | 3.1 km || 
|-id=335 bgcolor=#E9E9E9
| 222335 ||  || — || October 25, 2000 || Socorro || LINEAR || — || align=right | 3.4 km || 
|-id=336 bgcolor=#E9E9E9
| 222336 ||  || — || October 25, 2000 || Socorro || LINEAR || DOR || align=right | 4.9 km || 
|-id=337 bgcolor=#E9E9E9
| 222337 ||  || — || October 25, 2000 || Socorro || LINEAR || — || align=right | 3.0 km || 
|-id=338 bgcolor=#E9E9E9
| 222338 ||  || — || October 25, 2000 || Socorro || LINEAR || — || align=right | 3.0 km || 
|-id=339 bgcolor=#E9E9E9
| 222339 ||  || — || November 1, 2000 || Socorro || LINEAR || — || align=right | 1.1 km || 
|-id=340 bgcolor=#E9E9E9
| 222340 ||  || — || November 1, 2000 || Socorro || LINEAR || — || align=right | 3.4 km || 
|-id=341 bgcolor=#E9E9E9
| 222341 ||  || — || November 3, 2000 || Socorro || LINEAR || — || align=right | 1.9 km || 
|-id=342 bgcolor=#E9E9E9
| 222342 ||  || — || November 22, 2000 || Eskridge || G. Hug || — || align=right | 3.7 km || 
|-id=343 bgcolor=#E9E9E9
| 222343 ||  || — || November 23, 2000 || Bisei SG Center || BATTeRS || — || align=right | 2.5 km || 
|-id=344 bgcolor=#E9E9E9
| 222344 ||  || — || November 20, 2000 || Socorro || LINEAR || — || align=right | 2.7 km || 
|-id=345 bgcolor=#E9E9E9
| 222345 ||  || — || November 26, 2000 || Kitt Peak || Spacewatch || PAD || align=right | 2.9 km || 
|-id=346 bgcolor=#E9E9E9
| 222346 ||  || — || November 28, 2000 || Kitt Peak || Spacewatch || AGN || align=right | 1.9 km || 
|-id=347 bgcolor=#E9E9E9
| 222347 ||  || — || November 20, 2000 || Socorro || LINEAR || — || align=right | 2.2 km || 
|-id=348 bgcolor=#E9E9E9
| 222348 ||  || — || November 20, 2000 || Socorro || LINEAR || WIT || align=right | 1.9 km || 
|-id=349 bgcolor=#E9E9E9
| 222349 ||  || — || November 21, 2000 || Socorro || LINEAR || — || align=right | 4.7 km || 
|-id=350 bgcolor=#E9E9E9
| 222350 ||  || — || November 21, 2000 || Socorro || LINEAR || HOF || align=right | 4.7 km || 
|-id=351 bgcolor=#E9E9E9
| 222351 ||  || — || November 18, 2000 || Kitt Peak || Spacewatch || — || align=right | 3.0 km || 
|-id=352 bgcolor=#E9E9E9
| 222352 ||  || — || November 18, 2000 || Kitt Peak || Spacewatch || — || align=right | 3.2 km || 
|-id=353 bgcolor=#E9E9E9
| 222353 ||  || — || November 19, 2000 || Kitt Peak || Spacewatch || INO || align=right | 2.4 km || 
|-id=354 bgcolor=#E9E9E9
| 222354 ||  || — || November 20, 2000 || Kitt Peak || Spacewatch || — || align=right | 3.9 km || 
|-id=355 bgcolor=#E9E9E9
| 222355 ||  || — || November 27, 2000 || Haleakala || NEAT || — || align=right | 3.3 km || 
|-id=356 bgcolor=#E9E9E9
| 222356 ||  || — || November 29, 2000 || Kitt Peak || Spacewatch || GEF || align=right | 2.3 km || 
|-id=357 bgcolor=#E9E9E9
| 222357 ||  || — || November 23, 2000 || Haleakala || NEAT || — || align=right | 4.5 km || 
|-id=358 bgcolor=#E9E9E9
| 222358 ||  || — || November 22, 2000 || Haleakala || NEAT || GAL || align=right | 2.3 km || 
|-id=359 bgcolor=#E9E9E9
| 222359 ||  || — || December 1, 2000 || Socorro || LINEAR || DOR || align=right | 2.9 km || 
|-id=360 bgcolor=#E9E9E9
| 222360 ||  || — || December 4, 2000 || Socorro || LINEAR || — || align=right | 3.7 km || 
|-id=361 bgcolor=#E9E9E9
| 222361 ||  || — || December 4, 2000 || Socorro || LINEAR || WAT || align=right | 2.9 km || 
|-id=362 bgcolor=#E9E9E9
| 222362 ||  || — || December 4, 2000 || Socorro || LINEAR || — || align=right | 3.5 km || 
|-id=363 bgcolor=#E9E9E9
| 222363 ||  || — || December 4, 2000 || Socorro || LINEAR || GEF || align=right | 2.1 km || 
|-id=364 bgcolor=#E9E9E9
| 222364 ||  || — || December 4, 2000 || Socorro || LINEAR || — || align=right | 4.3 km || 
|-id=365 bgcolor=#E9E9E9
| 222365 ||  || — || December 4, 2000 || Socorro || LINEAR || — || align=right | 3.4 km || 
|-id=366 bgcolor=#E9E9E9
| 222366 ||  || — || December 4, 2000 || Socorro || LINEAR || — || align=right | 2.1 km || 
|-id=367 bgcolor=#E9E9E9
| 222367 ||  || — || December 5, 2000 || Socorro || LINEAR || — || align=right | 3.2 km || 
|-id=368 bgcolor=#d6d6d6
| 222368 ||  || — || December 18, 2000 || Socorro || Spacewatch || KOR || align=right | 1.9 km || 
|-id=369 bgcolor=#d6d6d6
| 222369 ||  || — || December 23, 2000 || Haleakala || NEAT || — || align=right | 4.9 km || 
|-id=370 bgcolor=#E9E9E9
| 222370 ||  || — || December 30, 2000 || Socorro || LINEAR || — || align=right | 3.5 km || 
|-id=371 bgcolor=#E9E9E9
| 222371 ||  || — || December 30, 2000 || Socorro || LINEAR || — || align=right | 2.3 km || 
|-id=372 bgcolor=#E9E9E9
| 222372 ||  || — || December 30, 2000 || Socorro || LINEAR || CLO || align=right | 1.7 km || 
|-id=373 bgcolor=#E9E9E9
| 222373 ||  || — || December 28, 2000 || Socorro || LINEAR || — || align=right | 2.1 km || 
|-id=374 bgcolor=#d6d6d6
| 222374 ||  || — || December 29, 2000 || Kitt Peak || Spacewatch || — || align=right | 4.9 km || 
|-id=375 bgcolor=#fefefe
| 222375 ||  || — || December 30, 2000 || Kitt Peak || Spacewatch || — || align=right | 1.1 km || 
|-id=376 bgcolor=#E9E9E9
| 222376 ||  || — || January 4, 2001 || Socorro || LINEAR || — || align=right | 5.8 km || 
|-id=377 bgcolor=#fefefe
| 222377 ||  || — || January 19, 2001 || Socorro || LINEAR || — || align=right | 1.3 km || 
|-id=378 bgcolor=#d6d6d6
| 222378 ||  || — || January 20, 2001 || Socorro || LINEAR || EOS || align=right | 3.4 km || 
|-id=379 bgcolor=#C2FFFF
| 222379 ||  || — || January 19, 2001 || Kitt Peak || Spacewatch || L4 || align=right | 12 km || 
|-id=380 bgcolor=#d6d6d6
| 222380 ||  || — || February 15, 2001 || Socorro || LINEAR || — || align=right | 4.1 km || 
|-id=381 bgcolor=#d6d6d6
| 222381 ||  || — || February 16, 2001 || Socorro || LINEAR || — || align=right | 4.7 km || 
|-id=382 bgcolor=#d6d6d6
| 222382 ||  || — || February 17, 2001 || Socorro || LINEAR || EUP || align=right | 5.8 km || 
|-id=383 bgcolor=#d6d6d6
| 222383 ||  || — || February 19, 2001 || Nogales || Tenagra II Obs. || EOS || align=right | 2.8 km || 
|-id=384 bgcolor=#C2FFFF
| 222384 ||  || — || February 16, 2001 || Socorro || LINEAR || L4 || align=right | 18 km || 
|-id=385 bgcolor=#fefefe
| 222385 ||  || — || February 19, 2001 || Socorro || LINEAR || — || align=right | 1.0 km || 
|-id=386 bgcolor=#d6d6d6
| 222386 ||  || — || February 19, 2001 || Socorro || LINEAR || EOS || align=right | 3.0 km || 
|-id=387 bgcolor=#d6d6d6
| 222387 ||  || — || February 19, 2001 || Socorro || LINEAR || — || align=right | 2.8 km || 
|-id=388 bgcolor=#d6d6d6
| 222388 ||  || — || February 19, 2001 || Socorro || LINEAR || — || align=right | 4.3 km || 
|-id=389 bgcolor=#FA8072
| 222389 ||  || — || February 21, 2001 || Haleakala || NEAT || — || align=right data-sort-value="0.73" | 730 m || 
|-id=390 bgcolor=#d6d6d6
| 222390 ||  || — || February 17, 2001 || Socorro || LINEAR || — || align=right | 4.8 km || 
|-id=391 bgcolor=#d6d6d6
| 222391 ||  || — || February 17, 2001 || Socorro || LINEAR || — || align=right | 4.4 km || 
|-id=392 bgcolor=#d6d6d6
| 222392 ||  || — || March 2, 2001 || Haleakala || NEAT || — || align=right | 4.1 km || 
|-id=393 bgcolor=#fefefe
| 222393 ||  || — || March 2, 2001 || Anderson Mesa || LONEOS || — || align=right | 1.2 km || 
|-id=394 bgcolor=#fefefe
| 222394 ||  || — || March 2, 2001 || Haleakala || NEAT || — || align=right | 1.1 km || 
|-id=395 bgcolor=#fefefe
| 222395 ||  || — || March 1, 2001 || Socorro || LINEAR || H || align=right | 1.1 km || 
|-id=396 bgcolor=#d6d6d6
| 222396 ||  || — || March 15, 2001 || Haleakala || NEAT || — || align=right | 3.0 km || 
|-id=397 bgcolor=#fefefe
| 222397 ||  || — || March 2, 2001 || Anderson Mesa || LONEOS || — || align=right data-sort-value="0.95" | 950 m || 
|-id=398 bgcolor=#d6d6d6
| 222398 ||  || — || March 19, 2001 || Anderson Mesa || LONEOS || HYG || align=right | 5.0 km || 
|-id=399 bgcolor=#d6d6d6
| 222399 ||  || — || March 19, 2001 || Anderson Mesa || LONEOS || EMA || align=right | 4.9 km || 
|-id=400 bgcolor=#fefefe
| 222400 ||  || — || March 19, 2001 || Anderson Mesa || LONEOS || — || align=right | 1.0 km || 
|}

222401–222500 

|-bgcolor=#d6d6d6
| 222401 ||  || — || March 19, 2001 || Anderson Mesa || LONEOS || EOS || align=right | 3.6 km || 
|-id=402 bgcolor=#d6d6d6
| 222402 ||  || — || March 18, 2001 || Socorro || LINEAR || — || align=right | 5.5 km || 
|-id=403 bgcolor=#d6d6d6
| 222403 Bethchristie ||  ||  || March 22, 2001 || Junk Bond || D. Healy || THM || align=right | 2.9 km || 
|-id=404 bgcolor=#d6d6d6
| 222404 ||  || — || March 18, 2001 || Socorro || LINEAR || EUP || align=right | 5.9 km || 
|-id=405 bgcolor=#d6d6d6
| 222405 ||  || — || March 19, 2001 || Socorro || LINEAR || — || align=right | 4.0 km || 
|-id=406 bgcolor=#d6d6d6
| 222406 ||  || — || March 19, 2001 || Socorro || LINEAR || — || align=right | 5.2 km || 
|-id=407 bgcolor=#d6d6d6
| 222407 ||  || — || March 26, 2001 || Socorro || LINEAR || EUP || align=right | 6.3 km || 
|-id=408 bgcolor=#d6d6d6
| 222408 ||  || — || March 18, 2001 || Socorro || LINEAR || HYG || align=right | 4.9 km || 
|-id=409 bgcolor=#fefefe
| 222409 ||  || — || March 18, 2001 || Anderson Mesa || LONEOS || — || align=right | 1.6 km || 
|-id=410 bgcolor=#d6d6d6
| 222410 ||  || — || March 18, 2001 || Kitt Peak || Spacewatch || EOS || align=right | 3.0 km || 
|-id=411 bgcolor=#d6d6d6
| 222411 ||  || — || March 29, 2001 || Socorro || LINEAR || — || align=right | 3.5 km || 
|-id=412 bgcolor=#d6d6d6
| 222412 ||  || — || March 20, 2001 || Haleakala || NEAT || — || align=right | 4.0 km || 
|-id=413 bgcolor=#fefefe
| 222413 ||  || — || March 26, 2001 || Haleakala || NEAT || — || align=right | 1.0 km || 
|-id=414 bgcolor=#d6d6d6
| 222414 ||  || — || March 18, 2001 || Anderson Mesa || LONEOS || — || align=right | 3.5 km || 
|-id=415 bgcolor=#d6d6d6
| 222415 ||  || — || March 24, 2001 || Haleakala || NEAT || ALA || align=right | 7.0 km || 
|-id=416 bgcolor=#fefefe
| 222416 ||  || — || April 15, 2001 || Socorro || LINEAR || — || align=right | 1.3 km || 
|-id=417 bgcolor=#d6d6d6
| 222417 ||  || — || April 23, 2001 || Socorro || LINEAR || — || align=right | 4.2 km || 
|-id=418 bgcolor=#fefefe
| 222418 ||  || — || April 18, 2001 || Socorro || LINEAR || — || align=right | 1.4 km || 
|-id=419 bgcolor=#fefefe
| 222419 ||  || — || May 3, 2001 || Haleakala || NEAT || — || align=right data-sort-value="0.97" | 970 m || 
|-id=420 bgcolor=#fefefe
| 222420 ||  || — || May 17, 2001 || Socorro || LINEAR || — || align=right | 1.4 km || 
|-id=421 bgcolor=#fefefe
| 222421 ||  || — || May 17, 2001 || Kitt Peak || Spacewatch || — || align=right | 1.4 km || 
|-id=422 bgcolor=#fefefe
| 222422 ||  || — || May 18, 2001 || Socorro || LINEAR || — || align=right data-sort-value="0.93" | 930 m || 
|-id=423 bgcolor=#d6d6d6
| 222423 ||  || — || May 24, 2001 || Anderson Mesa || LONEOS || — || align=right | 6.6 km || 
|-id=424 bgcolor=#fefefe
| 222424 ||  || — || June 20, 2001 || Palomar || NEAT || — || align=right | 1.3 km || 
|-id=425 bgcolor=#fefefe
| 222425 ||  || — || July 17, 2001 || Haleakala || NEAT || — || align=right | 1.5 km || 
|-id=426 bgcolor=#fefefe
| 222426 ||  || — || July 18, 2001 || Palomar || NEAT || H || align=right | 1.1 km || 
|-id=427 bgcolor=#d6d6d6
| 222427 ||  || — || July 20, 2001 || Palomar || NEAT || HIL3:2 || align=right | 8.9 km || 
|-id=428 bgcolor=#fefefe
| 222428 ||  || — || July 25, 2001 || Haleakala || NEAT || — || align=right | 1.5 km || 
|-id=429 bgcolor=#fefefe
| 222429 ||  || — || July 28, 2001 || Anderson Mesa || LONEOS || — || align=right | 2.1 km || 
|-id=430 bgcolor=#fefefe
| 222430 ||  || — || August 8, 2001 || Haleakala || NEAT || NYS || align=right data-sort-value="0.96" | 960 m || 
|-id=431 bgcolor=#fefefe
| 222431 ||  || — || August 11, 2001 || Palomar || NEAT || NYS || align=right | 1.00 km || 
|-id=432 bgcolor=#fefefe
| 222432 ||  || — || August 14, 2001 || Haleakala || NEAT || — || align=right | 1.3 km || 
|-id=433 bgcolor=#fefefe
| 222433 || 2001 QB || — || August 16, 2001 || Badlands || Badlands Obs. || NYS || align=right data-sort-value="0.73" | 730 m || 
|-id=434 bgcolor=#E9E9E9
| 222434 ||  || — || August 17, 2001 || Socorro || LINEAR || — || align=right | 2.6 km || 
|-id=435 bgcolor=#fefefe
| 222435 ||  || — || August 16, 2001 || Socorro || LINEAR || NYS || align=right data-sort-value="0.79" | 790 m || 
|-id=436 bgcolor=#fefefe
| 222436 ||  || — || August 16, 2001 || Socorro || LINEAR || CIM || align=right | 3.0 km || 
|-id=437 bgcolor=#fefefe
| 222437 ||  || — || August 16, 2001 || Socorro || LINEAR || — || align=right | 3.3 km || 
|-id=438 bgcolor=#fefefe
| 222438 ||  || — || August 16, 2001 || Socorro || LINEAR || — || align=right | 1.2 km || 
|-id=439 bgcolor=#fefefe
| 222439 ||  || — || August 16, 2001 || Socorro || LINEAR || MAS || align=right data-sort-value="0.97" | 970 m || 
|-id=440 bgcolor=#fefefe
| 222440 ||  || — || August 18, 2001 || Socorro || LINEAR || H || align=right data-sort-value="0.82" | 820 m || 
|-id=441 bgcolor=#fefefe
| 222441 ||  || — || August 22, 2001 || Socorro || LINEAR || H || align=right data-sort-value="0.69" | 690 m || 
|-id=442 bgcolor=#fefefe
| 222442 ||  || — || August 22, 2001 || Haleakala || NEAT || H || align=right data-sort-value="0.98" | 980 m || 
|-id=443 bgcolor=#fefefe
| 222443 ||  || — || August 23, 2001 || Socorro || LINEAR || H || align=right data-sort-value="0.75" | 750 m || 
|-id=444 bgcolor=#E9E9E9
| 222444 ||  || — || August 19, 2001 || Socorro || LINEAR || — || align=right | 1.5 km || 
|-id=445 bgcolor=#E9E9E9
| 222445 ||  || — || August 26, 2001 || Socorro || LINEAR || — || align=right | 3.0 km || 
|-id=446 bgcolor=#fefefe
| 222446 ||  || — || August 23, 2001 || Anderson Mesa || LONEOS || MAS || align=right data-sort-value="0.84" | 840 m || 
|-id=447 bgcolor=#fefefe
| 222447 ||  || — || August 24, 2001 || Haleakala || NEAT || — || align=right | 1.6 km || 
|-id=448 bgcolor=#fefefe
| 222448 ||  || — || August 23, 2001 || Socorro || LINEAR || H || align=right | 1.1 km || 
|-id=449 bgcolor=#fefefe
| 222449 ||  || — || August 25, 2001 || Socorro || LINEAR || — || align=right | 1.9 km || 
|-id=450 bgcolor=#d6d6d6
| 222450 ||  || — || August 23, 2001 || Desert Eagle || W. K. Y. Yeung || 3:2 || align=right | 6.5 km || 
|-id=451 bgcolor=#fefefe
| 222451 ||  || — || August 23, 2001 || Anderson Mesa || LONEOS || MAS || align=right data-sort-value="0.96" | 960 m || 
|-id=452 bgcolor=#fefefe
| 222452 ||  || — || August 25, 2001 || Socorro || LINEAR || — || align=right | 1.3 km || 
|-id=453 bgcolor=#E9E9E9
| 222453 ||  || — || August 25, 2001 || Anderson Mesa || LONEOS || — || align=right | 1.6 km || 
|-id=454 bgcolor=#d6d6d6
| 222454 ||  || — || August 19, 2001 || Socorro || LINEAR || HIL3:2 || align=right | 6.9 km || 
|-id=455 bgcolor=#E9E9E9
| 222455 ||  || — || August 16, 2001 || Socorro || LINEAR || — || align=right | 2.5 km || 
|-id=456 bgcolor=#fefefe
| 222456 ||  || — || September 8, 2001 || Socorro || LINEAR || — || align=right | 1.2 km || 
|-id=457 bgcolor=#fefefe
| 222457 ||  || — || September 10, 2001 || Socorro || LINEAR || MAS || align=right | 1.1 km || 
|-id=458 bgcolor=#fefefe
| 222458 ||  || — || September 7, 2001 || Socorro || LINEAR || — || align=right | 1.3 km || 
|-id=459 bgcolor=#fefefe
| 222459 ||  || — || September 7, 2001 || Socorro || LINEAR || SUL || align=right | 3.2 km || 
|-id=460 bgcolor=#fefefe
| 222460 ||  || — || September 8, 2001 || Socorro || LINEAR || — || align=right | 1.6 km || 
|-id=461 bgcolor=#fefefe
| 222461 ||  || — || September 12, 2001 || Socorro || LINEAR || H || align=right data-sort-value="0.79" | 790 m || 
|-id=462 bgcolor=#fefefe
| 222462 ||  || — || September 9, 2001 || Palomar || NEAT || — || align=right | 1.6 km || 
|-id=463 bgcolor=#fefefe
| 222463 ||  || — || September 11, 2001 || Anderson Mesa || LONEOS || — || align=right | 1.8 km || 
|-id=464 bgcolor=#fefefe
| 222464 ||  || — || September 11, 2001 || Anderson Mesa || LONEOS || — || align=right | 1.2 km || 
|-id=465 bgcolor=#E9E9E9
| 222465 ||  || — || September 12, 2001 || Kitt Peak || Spacewatch || — || align=right | 1.1 km || 
|-id=466 bgcolor=#fefefe
| 222466 ||  || — || September 12, 2001 || Socorro || LINEAR || — || align=right | 1.6 km || 
|-id=467 bgcolor=#fefefe
| 222467 ||  || — || September 12, 2001 || Socorro || LINEAR || NYS || align=right | 1.1 km || 
|-id=468 bgcolor=#fefefe
| 222468 ||  || — || September 12, 2001 || Socorro || LINEAR || — || align=right data-sort-value="0.84" | 840 m || 
|-id=469 bgcolor=#fefefe
| 222469 ||  || — || September 12, 2001 || Socorro || LINEAR || — || align=right | 1.5 km || 
|-id=470 bgcolor=#fefefe
| 222470 ||  || — || September 12, 2001 || Socorro || LINEAR || V || align=right | 1.2 km || 
|-id=471 bgcolor=#E9E9E9
| 222471 ||  || — || September 16, 2001 || Socorro || LINEAR || — || align=right | 1.3 km || 
|-id=472 bgcolor=#fefefe
| 222472 ||  || — || September 16, 2001 || Socorro || LINEAR || — || align=right | 1.5 km || 
|-id=473 bgcolor=#d6d6d6
| 222473 ||  || — || September 16, 2001 || Socorro || LINEAR || HIL3:2 || align=right | 8.1 km || 
|-id=474 bgcolor=#E9E9E9
| 222474 ||  || — || September 16, 2001 || Socorro || LINEAR || — || align=right | 1.4 km || 
|-id=475 bgcolor=#E9E9E9
| 222475 ||  || — || September 16, 2001 || Socorro || LINEAR || — || align=right | 2.3 km || 
|-id=476 bgcolor=#fefefe
| 222476 ||  || — || September 20, 2001 || Socorro || LINEAR || — || align=right | 1.6 km || 
|-id=477 bgcolor=#fefefe
| 222477 ||  || — || September 20, 2001 || Socorro || LINEAR || — || align=right | 1.1 km || 
|-id=478 bgcolor=#fefefe
| 222478 ||  || — || September 20, 2001 || Socorro || LINEAR || — || align=right | 1.3 km || 
|-id=479 bgcolor=#fefefe
| 222479 ||  || — || September 20, 2001 || Socorro || LINEAR || V || align=right data-sort-value="0.81" | 810 m || 
|-id=480 bgcolor=#fefefe
| 222480 ||  || — || September 20, 2001 || Socorro || LINEAR || SUL || align=right | 2.7 km || 
|-id=481 bgcolor=#E9E9E9
| 222481 ||  || — || September 20, 2001 || Socorro || LINEAR || — || align=right | 2.0 km || 
|-id=482 bgcolor=#fefefe
| 222482 ||  || — || September 20, 2001 || Socorro || LINEAR || H || align=right | 1.2 km || 
|-id=483 bgcolor=#fefefe
| 222483 ||  || — || September 16, 2001 || Socorro || LINEAR || SUL || align=right | 2.0 km || 
|-id=484 bgcolor=#E9E9E9
| 222484 ||  || — || September 16, 2001 || Socorro || LINEAR || — || align=right data-sort-value="0.92" | 920 m || 
|-id=485 bgcolor=#E9E9E9
| 222485 ||  || — || September 16, 2001 || Socorro || LINEAR || HNS || align=right | 1.5 km || 
|-id=486 bgcolor=#fefefe
| 222486 ||  || — || September 17, 2001 || Socorro || LINEAR || V || align=right | 1.4 km || 
|-id=487 bgcolor=#fefefe
| 222487 ||  || — || September 19, 2001 || Socorro || LINEAR || MAS || align=right data-sort-value="0.99" | 990 m || 
|-id=488 bgcolor=#d6d6d6
| 222488 ||  || — || September 16, 2001 || Socorro || LINEAR || SHU3:2 || align=right | 8.9 km || 
|-id=489 bgcolor=#fefefe
| 222489 ||  || — || September 19, 2001 || Socorro || LINEAR || MAS || align=right data-sort-value="0.97" | 970 m || 
|-id=490 bgcolor=#d6d6d6
| 222490 ||  || — || September 19, 2001 || Socorro || LINEAR || SHU3:2 || align=right | 6.2 km || 
|-id=491 bgcolor=#fefefe
| 222491 ||  || — || September 19, 2001 || Socorro || LINEAR || — || align=right | 1.2 km || 
|-id=492 bgcolor=#E9E9E9
| 222492 ||  || — || September 19, 2001 || Socorro || LINEAR || — || align=right data-sort-value="0.99" | 990 m || 
|-id=493 bgcolor=#E9E9E9
| 222493 ||  || — || September 19, 2001 || Socorro || LINEAR || — || align=right | 2.0 km || 
|-id=494 bgcolor=#E9E9E9
| 222494 ||  || — || September 19, 2001 || Socorro || LINEAR || — || align=right | 1.2 km || 
|-id=495 bgcolor=#fefefe
| 222495 ||  || — || September 25, 2001 || Socorro || LINEAR || H || align=right data-sort-value="0.65" | 650 m || 
|-id=496 bgcolor=#fefefe
| 222496 ||  || — || September 26, 2001 || Socorro || LINEAR || H || align=right data-sort-value="0.97" | 970 m || 
|-id=497 bgcolor=#FA8072
| 222497 ||  || — || September 27, 2001 || Socorro || LINEAR || — || align=right | 2.6 km || 
|-id=498 bgcolor=#E9E9E9
| 222498 ||  || — || September 19, 2001 || Socorro || LINEAR || — || align=right data-sort-value="0.83" | 830 m || 
|-id=499 bgcolor=#E9E9E9
| 222499 ||  || — || September 20, 2001 || Socorro || LINEAR || — || align=right | 1.0 km || 
|-id=500 bgcolor=#fefefe
| 222500 ||  || — || September 21, 2001 || Socorro || LINEAR || — || align=right | 1.2 km || 
|}

222501–222600 

|-bgcolor=#E9E9E9
| 222501 ||  || — || September 25, 2001 || Socorro || LINEAR || — || align=right | 4.4 km || 
|-id=502 bgcolor=#fefefe
| 222502 ||  || — || October 10, 2001 || Palomar || NEAT || — || align=right | 1.6 km || 
|-id=503 bgcolor=#E9E9E9
| 222503 ||  || — || October 9, 2001 || Socorro || LINEAR || RAF || align=right | 2.1 km || 
|-id=504 bgcolor=#fefefe
| 222504 ||  || — || October 13, 2001 || Socorro || LINEAR || — || align=right | 1.2 km || 
|-id=505 bgcolor=#fefefe
| 222505 ||  || — || October 14, 2001 || Socorro || LINEAR || H || align=right | 1.1 km || 
|-id=506 bgcolor=#fefefe
| 222506 ||  || — || October 14, 2001 || Socorro || LINEAR || H || align=right data-sort-value="0.99" | 990 m || 
|-id=507 bgcolor=#E9E9E9
| 222507 ||  || — || October 11, 2001 || Socorro || LINEAR || HNS || align=right | 2.0 km || 
|-id=508 bgcolor=#E9E9E9
| 222508 ||  || — || October 14, 2001 || Socorro || LINEAR || — || align=right | 1.1 km || 
|-id=509 bgcolor=#E9E9E9
| 222509 ||  || — || October 14, 2001 || Socorro || LINEAR || — || align=right | 1.6 km || 
|-id=510 bgcolor=#fefefe
| 222510 ||  || — || October 15, 2001 || Socorro || LINEAR || H || align=right data-sort-value="0.81" | 810 m || 
|-id=511 bgcolor=#E9E9E9
| 222511 ||  || — || October 14, 2001 || Cima Ekar || ADAS || MAR || align=right | 1.8 km || 
|-id=512 bgcolor=#fefefe
| 222512 ||  || — || October 13, 2001 || Socorro || LINEAR || H || align=right data-sort-value="0.83" | 830 m || 
|-id=513 bgcolor=#E9E9E9
| 222513 ||  || — || October 13, 2001 || Socorro || LINEAR || — || align=right | 1.4 km || 
|-id=514 bgcolor=#E9E9E9
| 222514 ||  || — || October 14, 2001 || Socorro || LINEAR || — || align=right | 1.2 km || 
|-id=515 bgcolor=#E9E9E9
| 222515 ||  || — || October 14, 2001 || Socorro || LINEAR || — || align=right | 1.7 km || 
|-id=516 bgcolor=#E9E9E9
| 222516 ||  || — || October 15, 2001 || Socorro || LINEAR || GER || align=right | 1.6 km || 
|-id=517 bgcolor=#d6d6d6
| 222517 ||  || — || October 14, 2001 || Kitt Peak || Spacewatch || HIL3:2 || align=right | 7.4 km || 
|-id=518 bgcolor=#fefefe
| 222518 ||  || — || October 10, 2001 || Palomar || NEAT || — || align=right | 1.2 km || 
|-id=519 bgcolor=#E9E9E9
| 222519 ||  || — || October 10, 2001 || Palomar || NEAT || — || align=right | 1.3 km || 
|-id=520 bgcolor=#d6d6d6
| 222520 ||  || — || October 15, 2001 || Haleakala || NEAT || 3:2 || align=right | 6.7 km || 
|-id=521 bgcolor=#d6d6d6
| 222521 ||  || — || October 11, 2001 || Palomar || NEAT || HIL3:2 || align=right | 8.6 km || 
|-id=522 bgcolor=#E9E9E9
| 222522 ||  || — || October 15, 2001 || Socorro || LINEAR || — || align=right | 2.1 km || 
|-id=523 bgcolor=#fefefe
| 222523 ||  || — || October 14, 2001 || Socorro || LINEAR || — || align=right | 2.9 km || 
|-id=524 bgcolor=#E9E9E9
| 222524 ||  || — || October 11, 2001 || Socorro || LINEAR || — || align=right | 1.6 km || 
|-id=525 bgcolor=#E9E9E9
| 222525 ||  || — || October 15, 2001 || Socorro || LINEAR || — || align=right | 1.4 km || 
|-id=526 bgcolor=#fefefe
| 222526 || 2001 UX || — || October 17, 2001 || Socorro || LINEAR || H || align=right data-sort-value="0.85" | 850 m || 
|-id=527 bgcolor=#FA8072
| 222527 ||  || — || October 18, 2001 || Socorro || LINEAR || H || align=right | 1.0 km || 
|-id=528 bgcolor=#fefefe
| 222528 ||  || — || October 17, 2001 || Socorro || LINEAR || H || align=right data-sort-value="0.67" | 670 m || 
|-id=529 bgcolor=#E9E9E9
| 222529 ||  || — || October 18, 2001 || Socorro || LINEAR || — || align=right | 2.0 km || 
|-id=530 bgcolor=#E9E9E9
| 222530 ||  || — || October 16, 2001 || Socorro || LINEAR || — || align=right | 2.4 km || 
|-id=531 bgcolor=#fefefe
| 222531 ||  || — || October 17, 2001 || Socorro || LINEAR || NYS || align=right | 1.2 km || 
|-id=532 bgcolor=#E9E9E9
| 222532 ||  || — || October 17, 2001 || Socorro || LINEAR || — || align=right | 1.5 km || 
|-id=533 bgcolor=#E9E9E9
| 222533 ||  || — || October 17, 2001 || Socorro || LINEAR || — || align=right | 1.9 km || 
|-id=534 bgcolor=#E9E9E9
| 222534 ||  || — || October 18, 2001 || Socorro || LINEAR || GER || align=right | 2.1 km || 
|-id=535 bgcolor=#E9E9E9
| 222535 ||  || — || October 17, 2001 || Socorro || LINEAR || KON || align=right | 3.2 km || 
|-id=536 bgcolor=#fefefe
| 222536 ||  || — || October 23, 2001 || Socorro || LINEAR || H || align=right data-sort-value="0.76" | 760 m || 
|-id=537 bgcolor=#fefefe
| 222537 ||  || — || October 23, 2001 || Socorro || LINEAR || — || align=right | 1.2 km || 
|-id=538 bgcolor=#E9E9E9
| 222538 ||  || — || October 21, 2001 || Socorro || LINEAR || — || align=right | 2.2 km || 
|-id=539 bgcolor=#E9E9E9
| 222539 ||  || — || October 21, 2001 || Socorro || LINEAR || — || align=right | 3.0 km || 
|-id=540 bgcolor=#E9E9E9
| 222540 ||  || — || October 18, 2001 || Palomar || NEAT || KON || align=right | 3.0 km || 
|-id=541 bgcolor=#E9E9E9
| 222541 ||  || — || October 18, 2001 || Anderson Mesa || LONEOS || — || align=right | 3.3 km || 
|-id=542 bgcolor=#E9E9E9
| 222542 ||  || — || October 19, 2001 || Anderson Mesa || LONEOS || — || align=right | 1.1 km || 
|-id=543 bgcolor=#E9E9E9
| 222543 ||  || — || October 23, 2001 || Kitt Peak || Spacewatch || — || align=right | 1.0 km || 
|-id=544 bgcolor=#E9E9E9
| 222544 ||  || — || October 18, 2001 || Desert Eagle || W. K. Y. Yeung || — || align=right | 2.0 km || 
|-id=545 bgcolor=#E9E9E9
| 222545 ||  || — || October 18, 2001 || Kitt Peak || Spacewatch || — || align=right | 1.2 km || 
|-id=546 bgcolor=#fefefe
| 222546 ||  || — || November 9, 2001 || Socorro || LINEAR || H || align=right data-sort-value="0.78" | 780 m || 
|-id=547 bgcolor=#fefefe
| 222547 ||  || — || November 10, 2001 || Socorro || LINEAR || H || align=right data-sort-value="0.82" | 820 m || 
|-id=548 bgcolor=#E9E9E9
| 222548 ||  || — || November 11, 2001 || Eskridge || G. Hug || — || align=right | 4.2 km || 
|-id=549 bgcolor=#E9E9E9
| 222549 ||  || — || November 9, 2001 || Socorro || LINEAR || — || align=right | 1.7 km || 
|-id=550 bgcolor=#E9E9E9
| 222550 ||  || — || November 10, 2001 || Socorro || LINEAR || GER || align=right | 2.0 km || 
|-id=551 bgcolor=#E9E9E9
| 222551 ||  || — || November 10, 2001 || Socorro || LINEAR || — || align=right | 1.4 km || 
|-id=552 bgcolor=#fefefe
| 222552 ||  || — || November 10, 2001 || Socorro || LINEAR || H || align=right data-sort-value="0.82" | 820 m || 
|-id=553 bgcolor=#E9E9E9
| 222553 ||  || — || November 9, 2001 || Socorro || LINEAR || — || align=right | 1.3 km || 
|-id=554 bgcolor=#E9E9E9
| 222554 ||  || — || November 9, 2001 || Socorro || LINEAR || — || align=right | 1.5 km || 
|-id=555 bgcolor=#E9E9E9
| 222555 ||  || — || November 9, 2001 || Socorro || LINEAR || — || align=right | 1.9 km || 
|-id=556 bgcolor=#E9E9E9
| 222556 ||  || — || November 9, 2001 || Socorro || LINEAR || — || align=right | 2.6 km || 
|-id=557 bgcolor=#E9E9E9
| 222557 ||  || — || November 9, 2001 || Socorro || LINEAR || — || align=right | 1.9 km || 
|-id=558 bgcolor=#E9E9E9
| 222558 ||  || — || November 9, 2001 || Socorro || LINEAR || — || align=right | 1.4 km || 
|-id=559 bgcolor=#E9E9E9
| 222559 ||  || — || November 9, 2001 || Socorro || LINEAR || — || align=right | 1.3 km || 
|-id=560 bgcolor=#E9E9E9
| 222560 ||  || — || November 9, 2001 || Socorro || LINEAR || — || align=right | 2.5 km || 
|-id=561 bgcolor=#E9E9E9
| 222561 ||  || — || November 10, 2001 || Socorro || LINEAR || — || align=right | 1.2 km || 
|-id=562 bgcolor=#E9E9E9
| 222562 ||  || — || November 10, 2001 || Socorro || LINEAR || — || align=right | 1.3 km || 
|-id=563 bgcolor=#E9E9E9
| 222563 ||  || — || November 10, 2001 || Socorro || LINEAR || KON || align=right | 4.5 km || 
|-id=564 bgcolor=#E9E9E9
| 222564 ||  || — || November 11, 2001 || Socorro || LINEAR || — || align=right | 1.2 km || 
|-id=565 bgcolor=#fefefe
| 222565 ||  || — || November 12, 2001 || Socorro || LINEAR || — || align=right | 1.4 km || 
|-id=566 bgcolor=#E9E9E9
| 222566 ||  || — || November 12, 2001 || Socorro || LINEAR || — || align=right | 2.0 km || 
|-id=567 bgcolor=#E9E9E9
| 222567 ||  || — || November 12, 2001 || Socorro || LINEAR || — || align=right | 1.0 km || 
|-id=568 bgcolor=#E9E9E9
| 222568 ||  || — || November 12, 2001 || Socorro || LINEAR || — || align=right | 1.5 km || 
|-id=569 bgcolor=#E9E9E9
| 222569 ||  || — || November 15, 2001 || Socorro || LINEAR || — || align=right | 3.7 km || 
|-id=570 bgcolor=#E9E9E9
| 222570 ||  || — || November 15, 2001 || Socorro || LINEAR || — || align=right | 2.0 km || 
|-id=571 bgcolor=#E9E9E9
| 222571 ||  || — || November 12, 2001 || Socorro || LINEAR || KRM || align=right | 4.1 km || 
|-id=572 bgcolor=#E9E9E9
| 222572 ||  || — || November 12, 2001 || Socorro || LINEAR || — || align=right | 1.4 km || 
|-id=573 bgcolor=#E9E9E9
| 222573 ||  || — || November 12, 2001 || Socorro || LINEAR || — || align=right | 1.5 km || 
|-id=574 bgcolor=#E9E9E9
| 222574 ||  || — || November 15, 2001 || Palomar || NEAT || — || align=right | 1.6 km || 
|-id=575 bgcolor=#E9E9E9
| 222575 ||  || — || November 11, 2001 || Anderson Mesa || LONEOS || — || align=right | 1.4 km || 
|-id=576 bgcolor=#E9E9E9
| 222576 ||  || — || November 14, 2001 || Kitt Peak || Spacewatch || — || align=right | 1.3 km || 
|-id=577 bgcolor=#E9E9E9
| 222577 || 2001 WA || — || November 16, 2001 || Oizumi || T. Kobayashi || — || align=right | 2.8 km || 
|-id=578 bgcolor=#E9E9E9
| 222578 ||  || — || November 17, 2001 || Socorro || LINEAR || — || align=right | 1.7 km || 
|-id=579 bgcolor=#E9E9E9
| 222579 ||  || — || November 17, 2001 || Socorro || LINEAR || — || align=right | 1.2 km || 
|-id=580 bgcolor=#E9E9E9
| 222580 ||  || — || November 17, 2001 || Socorro || LINEAR || — || align=right | 2.6 km || 
|-id=581 bgcolor=#E9E9E9
| 222581 ||  || — || November 17, 2001 || Socorro || LINEAR || — || align=right | 1.3 km || 
|-id=582 bgcolor=#E9E9E9
| 222582 ||  || — || November 16, 2001 || Kitt Peak || Spacewatch || JUN || align=right | 1.9 km || 
|-id=583 bgcolor=#E9E9E9
| 222583 ||  || — || November 17, 2001 || Socorro || LINEAR || KRM || align=right | 4.2 km || 
|-id=584 bgcolor=#E9E9E9
| 222584 ||  || — || November 17, 2001 || Socorro || LINEAR || — || align=right | 1.6 km || 
|-id=585 bgcolor=#E9E9E9
| 222585 ||  || — || November 18, 2001 || Socorro || LINEAR || — || align=right | 1.2 km || 
|-id=586 bgcolor=#E9E9E9
| 222586 ||  || — || November 18, 2001 || Socorro || LINEAR || — || align=right | 1.1 km || 
|-id=587 bgcolor=#d6d6d6
| 222587 ||  || — || November 18, 2001 || Socorro || LINEAR || 3:2 || align=right | 7.2 km || 
|-id=588 bgcolor=#E9E9E9
| 222588 ||  || — || November 19, 2001 || Socorro || LINEAR || — || align=right | 2.7 km || 
|-id=589 bgcolor=#E9E9E9
| 222589 ||  || — || November 19, 2001 || Kitt Peak || Spacewatch || — || align=right | 1.2 km || 
|-id=590 bgcolor=#E9E9E9
| 222590 ||  || — || November 20, 2001 || Socorro || LINEAR || — || align=right | 1.5 km || 
|-id=591 bgcolor=#E9E9E9
| 222591 ||  || — || November 17, 2001 || Kitt Peak || Spacewatch || — || align=right data-sort-value="0.98" | 980 m || 
|-id=592 bgcolor=#E9E9E9
| 222592 ||  || — || December 8, 2001 || Socorro || LINEAR || BRU || align=right | 3.4 km || 
|-id=593 bgcolor=#fefefe
| 222593 ||  || — || December 10, 2001 || Socorro || LINEAR || H || align=right data-sort-value="0.86" | 860 m || 
|-id=594 bgcolor=#fefefe
| 222594 ||  || — || December 10, 2001 || Socorro || LINEAR || H || align=right data-sort-value="0.93" | 930 m || 
|-id=595 bgcolor=#fefefe
| 222595 ||  || — || December 10, 2001 || Socorro || LINEAR || H || align=right | 1.1 km || 
|-id=596 bgcolor=#E9E9E9
| 222596 ||  || — || December 7, 2001 || Socorro || LINEAR || — || align=right | 2.0 km || 
|-id=597 bgcolor=#E9E9E9
| 222597 ||  || — || December 7, 2001 || Socorro || LINEAR || — || align=right | 2.4 km || 
|-id=598 bgcolor=#E9E9E9
| 222598 ||  || — || December 10, 2001 || Kitt Peak || Spacewatch || — || align=right | 1.5 km || 
|-id=599 bgcolor=#E9E9E9
| 222599 ||  || — || December 9, 2001 || Socorro || LINEAR || ADE || align=right | 4.8 km || 
|-id=600 bgcolor=#E9E9E9
| 222600 ||  || — || December 13, 2001 || Socorro || LINEAR || — || align=right | 2.8 km || 
|}

222601–222700 

|-bgcolor=#E9E9E9
| 222601 ||  || — || December 9, 2001 || Socorro || LINEAR || — || align=right | 1.9 km || 
|-id=602 bgcolor=#E9E9E9
| 222602 ||  || — || December 9, 2001 || Socorro || LINEAR || MAR || align=right | 1.8 km || 
|-id=603 bgcolor=#E9E9E9
| 222603 ||  || — || December 9, 2001 || Socorro || LINEAR || — || align=right | 2.6 km || 
|-id=604 bgcolor=#E9E9E9
| 222604 ||  || — || December 10, 2001 || Socorro || LINEAR || — || align=right | 2.4 km || 
|-id=605 bgcolor=#E9E9E9
| 222605 ||  || — || December 11, 2001 || Socorro || LINEAR || — || align=right | 4.9 km || 
|-id=606 bgcolor=#E9E9E9
| 222606 ||  || — || December 9, 2001 || Socorro || LINEAR || — || align=right | 4.2 km || 
|-id=607 bgcolor=#E9E9E9
| 222607 ||  || — || December 9, 2001 || Socorro || LINEAR || KRM || align=right | 4.9 km || 
|-id=608 bgcolor=#E9E9E9
| 222608 ||  || — || December 9, 2001 || Socorro || LINEAR || KON || align=right | 3.4 km || 
|-id=609 bgcolor=#E9E9E9
| 222609 ||  || — || December 10, 2001 || Socorro || LINEAR || — || align=right | 1.0 km || 
|-id=610 bgcolor=#E9E9E9
| 222610 ||  || — || December 11, 2001 || Socorro || LINEAR || — || align=right | 1.3 km || 
|-id=611 bgcolor=#E9E9E9
| 222611 ||  || — || December 10, 2001 || Socorro || LINEAR || — || align=right | 2.0 km || 
|-id=612 bgcolor=#E9E9E9
| 222612 ||  || — || December 10, 2001 || Socorro || LINEAR || — || align=right | 3.6 km || 
|-id=613 bgcolor=#E9E9E9
| 222613 ||  || — || December 10, 2001 || Socorro || LINEAR || — || align=right | 2.1 km || 
|-id=614 bgcolor=#E9E9E9
| 222614 ||  || — || December 11, 2001 || Socorro || LINEAR || — || align=right | 1.5 km || 
|-id=615 bgcolor=#E9E9E9
| 222615 ||  || — || December 11, 2001 || Socorro || LINEAR || — || align=right | 1.4 km || 
|-id=616 bgcolor=#E9E9E9
| 222616 ||  || — || December 11, 2001 || Socorro || LINEAR || — || align=right | 1.3 km || 
|-id=617 bgcolor=#E9E9E9
| 222617 ||  || — || December 11, 2001 || Socorro || LINEAR || — || align=right | 2.6 km || 
|-id=618 bgcolor=#E9E9E9
| 222618 ||  || — || December 11, 2001 || Socorro || LINEAR || — || align=right | 1.9 km || 
|-id=619 bgcolor=#E9E9E9
| 222619 ||  || — || December 11, 2001 || Socorro || LINEAR || — || align=right | 1.8 km || 
|-id=620 bgcolor=#E9E9E9
| 222620 ||  || — || December 11, 2001 || Socorro || LINEAR || — || align=right | 1.3 km || 
|-id=621 bgcolor=#E9E9E9
| 222621 ||  || — || December 11, 2001 || Socorro || LINEAR || — || align=right | 2.6 km || 
|-id=622 bgcolor=#E9E9E9
| 222622 ||  || — || December 10, 2001 || Socorro || LINEAR || — || align=right | 1.4 km || 
|-id=623 bgcolor=#E9E9E9
| 222623 ||  || — || December 10, 2001 || Socorro || LINEAR || — || align=right | 1.5 km || 
|-id=624 bgcolor=#E9E9E9
| 222624 ||  || — || December 10, 2001 || Socorro || LINEAR || MIT || align=right | 5.0 km || 
|-id=625 bgcolor=#E9E9E9
| 222625 ||  || — || December 10, 2001 || Socorro || LINEAR || — || align=right | 1.4 km || 
|-id=626 bgcolor=#E9E9E9
| 222626 ||  || — || December 10, 2001 || Socorro || LINEAR || — || align=right | 1.6 km || 
|-id=627 bgcolor=#E9E9E9
| 222627 ||  || — || December 10, 2001 || Socorro || LINEAR || — || align=right | 1.2 km || 
|-id=628 bgcolor=#E9E9E9
| 222628 ||  || — || December 10, 2001 || Socorro || LINEAR || EUN || align=right | 2.4 km || 
|-id=629 bgcolor=#E9E9E9
| 222629 ||  || — || December 10, 2001 || Socorro || LINEAR || — || align=right | 2.1 km || 
|-id=630 bgcolor=#E9E9E9
| 222630 ||  || — || December 10, 2001 || Socorro || LINEAR || — || align=right | 1.8 km || 
|-id=631 bgcolor=#E9E9E9
| 222631 ||  || — || December 13, 2001 || Socorro || LINEAR || — || align=right | 2.2 km || 
|-id=632 bgcolor=#E9E9E9
| 222632 ||  || — || December 13, 2001 || Socorro || LINEAR || — || align=right | 3.9 km || 
|-id=633 bgcolor=#E9E9E9
| 222633 ||  || — || December 13, 2001 || Socorro || LINEAR || — || align=right | 1.9 km || 
|-id=634 bgcolor=#E9E9E9
| 222634 ||  || — || December 13, 2001 || Socorro || LINEAR || — || align=right | 1.8 km || 
|-id=635 bgcolor=#E9E9E9
| 222635 ||  || — || December 13, 2001 || Socorro || LINEAR || RAF || align=right | 1.9 km || 
|-id=636 bgcolor=#E9E9E9
| 222636 ||  || — || December 14, 2001 || Socorro || LINEAR || — || align=right | 1.1 km || 
|-id=637 bgcolor=#E9E9E9
| 222637 ||  || — || December 14, 2001 || Socorro || LINEAR || — || align=right | 1.2 km || 
|-id=638 bgcolor=#E9E9E9
| 222638 ||  || — || December 14, 2001 || Socorro || LINEAR || — || align=right | 1.3 km || 
|-id=639 bgcolor=#E9E9E9
| 222639 ||  || — || December 14, 2001 || Socorro || LINEAR || — || align=right | 2.4 km || 
|-id=640 bgcolor=#E9E9E9
| 222640 ||  || — || December 14, 2001 || Socorro || LINEAR || BRG || align=right | 2.4 km || 
|-id=641 bgcolor=#fefefe
| 222641 ||  || — || December 14, 2001 || Socorro || LINEAR || V || align=right | 1.1 km || 
|-id=642 bgcolor=#E9E9E9
| 222642 ||  || — || December 14, 2001 || Socorro || LINEAR || — || align=right | 1.4 km || 
|-id=643 bgcolor=#E9E9E9
| 222643 ||  || — || December 14, 2001 || Socorro || LINEAR || — || align=right | 2.2 km || 
|-id=644 bgcolor=#E9E9E9
| 222644 ||  || — || December 14, 2001 || Socorro || LINEAR || — || align=right | 1.1 km || 
|-id=645 bgcolor=#E9E9E9
| 222645 ||  || — || December 14, 2001 || Socorro || LINEAR || — || align=right | 1.8 km || 
|-id=646 bgcolor=#E9E9E9
| 222646 ||  || — || December 14, 2001 || Socorro || LINEAR || — || align=right | 2.8 km || 
|-id=647 bgcolor=#E9E9E9
| 222647 ||  || — || December 14, 2001 || Socorro || LINEAR || — || align=right | 2.4 km || 
|-id=648 bgcolor=#E9E9E9
| 222648 ||  || — || December 14, 2001 || Socorro || LINEAR || — || align=right | 2.2 km || 
|-id=649 bgcolor=#E9E9E9
| 222649 ||  || — || December 14, 2001 || Socorro || LINEAR || MIS || align=right | 3.3 km || 
|-id=650 bgcolor=#E9E9E9
| 222650 ||  || — || December 14, 2001 || Socorro || LINEAR || — || align=right | 1.7 km || 
|-id=651 bgcolor=#E9E9E9
| 222651 ||  || — || December 14, 2001 || Socorro || LINEAR || HEN || align=right | 1.5 km || 
|-id=652 bgcolor=#E9E9E9
| 222652 ||  || — || December 14, 2001 || Socorro || LINEAR || EUN || align=right | 1.7 km || 
|-id=653 bgcolor=#E9E9E9
| 222653 ||  || — || December 14, 2001 || Socorro || LINEAR || — || align=right | 1.4 km || 
|-id=654 bgcolor=#E9E9E9
| 222654 ||  || — || December 14, 2001 || Socorro || LINEAR || RAF || align=right | 1.7 km || 
|-id=655 bgcolor=#E9E9E9
| 222655 ||  || — || December 14, 2001 || Socorro || LINEAR || — || align=right | 1.5 km || 
|-id=656 bgcolor=#E9E9E9
| 222656 ||  || — || December 14, 2001 || Socorro || LINEAR || — || align=right | 1.6 km || 
|-id=657 bgcolor=#E9E9E9
| 222657 ||  || — || December 14, 2001 || Socorro || LINEAR || — || align=right | 2.2 km || 
|-id=658 bgcolor=#E9E9E9
| 222658 ||  || — || December 14, 2001 || Socorro || LINEAR || — || align=right | 1.6 km || 
|-id=659 bgcolor=#E9E9E9
| 222659 ||  || — || December 11, 2001 || Socorro || LINEAR || MIT || align=right | 4.8 km || 
|-id=660 bgcolor=#E9E9E9
| 222660 ||  || — || December 14, 2001 || Socorro || LINEAR || — || align=right | 1.5 km || 
|-id=661 bgcolor=#E9E9E9
| 222661 ||  || — || December 15, 2001 || Socorro || LINEAR || — || align=right | 2.1 km || 
|-id=662 bgcolor=#E9E9E9
| 222662 ||  || — || December 15, 2001 || Socorro || LINEAR || — || align=right | 2.2 km || 
|-id=663 bgcolor=#E9E9E9
| 222663 ||  || — || December 15, 2001 || Socorro || LINEAR || — || align=right | 1.2 km || 
|-id=664 bgcolor=#E9E9E9
| 222664 ||  || — || December 15, 2001 || Socorro || LINEAR || RAF || align=right | 1.3 km || 
|-id=665 bgcolor=#E9E9E9
| 222665 ||  || — || December 15, 2001 || Socorro || LINEAR || — || align=right | 1.5 km || 
|-id=666 bgcolor=#E9E9E9
| 222666 ||  || — || December 15, 2001 || Socorro || LINEAR || — || align=right | 1.4 km || 
|-id=667 bgcolor=#E9E9E9
| 222667 ||  || — || December 17, 2001 || Socorro || LINEAR || — || align=right | 1.6 km || 
|-id=668 bgcolor=#E9E9E9
| 222668 ||  || — || December 17, 2001 || Socorro || LINEAR || — || align=right | 2.4 km || 
|-id=669 bgcolor=#E9E9E9
| 222669 ||  || — || December 17, 2001 || Socorro || LINEAR || — || align=right | 2.2 km || 
|-id=670 bgcolor=#E9E9E9
| 222670 ||  || — || December 17, 2001 || Socorro || LINEAR || — || align=right | 2.8 km || 
|-id=671 bgcolor=#E9E9E9
| 222671 ||  || — || December 18, 2001 || Socorro || LINEAR || — || align=right | 1.1 km || 
|-id=672 bgcolor=#E9E9E9
| 222672 ||  || — || December 18, 2001 || Socorro || LINEAR || — || align=right | 1.2 km || 
|-id=673 bgcolor=#E9E9E9
| 222673 ||  || — || December 18, 2001 || Socorro || LINEAR || — || align=right | 1.8 km || 
|-id=674 bgcolor=#E9E9E9
| 222674 ||  || — || December 18, 2001 || Socorro || LINEAR || — || align=right | 1.9 km || 
|-id=675 bgcolor=#E9E9E9
| 222675 ||  || — || December 18, 2001 || Socorro || LINEAR || — || align=right | 2.2 km || 
|-id=676 bgcolor=#E9E9E9
| 222676 ||  || — || December 18, 2001 || Socorro || LINEAR || MIT || align=right | 3.5 km || 
|-id=677 bgcolor=#E9E9E9
| 222677 ||  || — || December 18, 2001 || Socorro || LINEAR || — || align=right | 1.6 km || 
|-id=678 bgcolor=#E9E9E9
| 222678 ||  || — || December 18, 2001 || Socorro || LINEAR || — || align=right | 1.9 km || 
|-id=679 bgcolor=#E9E9E9
| 222679 ||  || — || December 18, 2001 || Socorro || LINEAR || slow || align=right | 2.0 km || 
|-id=680 bgcolor=#E9E9E9
| 222680 ||  || — || December 18, 2001 || Socorro || LINEAR || — || align=right | 2.9 km || 
|-id=681 bgcolor=#E9E9E9
| 222681 ||  || — || December 18, 2001 || Socorro || LINEAR || — || align=right | 2.6 km || 
|-id=682 bgcolor=#E9E9E9
| 222682 ||  || — || December 18, 2001 || Socorro || LINEAR || — || align=right | 2.0 km || 
|-id=683 bgcolor=#E9E9E9
| 222683 ||  || — || December 18, 2001 || Palomar || NEAT || RAF || align=right | 1.4 km || 
|-id=684 bgcolor=#E9E9E9
| 222684 ||  || — || December 19, 2001 || Socorro || LINEAR || — || align=right | 1.7 km || 
|-id=685 bgcolor=#E9E9E9
| 222685 ||  || — || December 17, 2001 || Socorro || LINEAR || — || align=right | 1.5 km || 
|-id=686 bgcolor=#E9E9E9
| 222686 ||  || — || December 18, 2001 || Socorro || LINEAR || — || align=right | 1.4 km || 
|-id=687 bgcolor=#E9E9E9
| 222687 ||  || — || December 17, 2001 || Socorro || LINEAR || — || align=right | 1.7 km || 
|-id=688 bgcolor=#fefefe
| 222688 ||  || — || December 17, 2001 || Socorro || LINEAR || V || align=right | 1.1 km || 
|-id=689 bgcolor=#fefefe
| 222689 ||  || — || December 19, 2001 || Socorro || LINEAR || H || align=right | 1.00 km || 
|-id=690 bgcolor=#E9E9E9
| 222690 ||  || — || January 4, 2002 || Palomar || NEAT || HNS || align=right | 2.1 km || 
|-id=691 bgcolor=#E9E9E9
| 222691 ||  || — || January 4, 2002 || Palomar || NEAT || — || align=right | 3.8 km || 
|-id=692 bgcolor=#E9E9E9
| 222692 ||  || — || January 5, 2002 || Kitt Peak || Spacewatch || — || align=right | 3.0 km || 
|-id=693 bgcolor=#E9E9E9
| 222693 ||  || — || January 11, 2002 || Desert Eagle || W. K. Y. Yeung || — || align=right | 2.3 km || 
|-id=694 bgcolor=#E9E9E9
| 222694 ||  || — || January 11, 2002 || Desert Eagle || W. K. Y. Yeung || — || align=right | 2.7 km || 
|-id=695 bgcolor=#E9E9E9
| 222695 ||  || — || January 11, 2002 || Desert Eagle || W. K. Y. Yeung || — || align=right | 1.4 km || 
|-id=696 bgcolor=#E9E9E9
| 222696 ||  || — || January 6, 2002 || Socorro || LINEAR || — || align=right | 2.0 km || 
|-id=697 bgcolor=#E9E9E9
| 222697 ||  || — || January 4, 2002 || Haleakala || NEAT || — || align=right | 1.5 km || 
|-id=698 bgcolor=#E9E9E9
| 222698 ||  || — || January 12, 2002 || Socorro || LINEAR || — || align=right | 3.9 km || 
|-id=699 bgcolor=#E9E9E9
| 222699 ||  || — || January 11, 2002 || Kitt Peak || Spacewatch || — || align=right | 1.6 km || 
|-id=700 bgcolor=#E9E9E9
| 222700 ||  || — || January 9, 2002 || Socorro || LINEAR || — || align=right | 2.1 km || 
|}

222701–222800 

|-bgcolor=#E9E9E9
| 222701 ||  || — || January 9, 2002 || Socorro || LINEAR || — || align=right | 2.7 km || 
|-id=702 bgcolor=#E9E9E9
| 222702 ||  || — || January 9, 2002 || Socorro || LINEAR || — || align=right | 3.3 km || 
|-id=703 bgcolor=#E9E9E9
| 222703 ||  || — || January 8, 2002 || Socorro || LINEAR || — || align=right | 2.1 km || 
|-id=704 bgcolor=#E9E9E9
| 222704 ||  || — || January 8, 2002 || Socorro || LINEAR || — || align=right | 1.4 km || 
|-id=705 bgcolor=#E9E9E9
| 222705 ||  || — || January 8, 2002 || Socorro || LINEAR || — || align=right | 2.0 km || 
|-id=706 bgcolor=#E9E9E9
| 222706 ||  || — || January 8, 2002 || Socorro || LINEAR || — || align=right | 1.6 km || 
|-id=707 bgcolor=#E9E9E9
| 222707 ||  || — || January 8, 2002 || Socorro || LINEAR || NEM || align=right | 3.4 km || 
|-id=708 bgcolor=#E9E9E9
| 222708 ||  || — || January 9, 2002 || Socorro || LINEAR || — || align=right | 2.1 km || 
|-id=709 bgcolor=#E9E9E9
| 222709 ||  || — || January 11, 2002 || Socorro || LINEAR || — || align=right | 1.4 km || 
|-id=710 bgcolor=#E9E9E9
| 222710 ||  || — || January 15, 2002 || Eskridge || Farpoint Obs. || — || align=right | 2.4 km || 
|-id=711 bgcolor=#E9E9E9
| 222711 ||  || — || January 8, 2002 || Socorro || LINEAR || — || align=right | 2.2 km || 
|-id=712 bgcolor=#E9E9E9
| 222712 ||  || — || January 8, 2002 || Socorro || LINEAR || — || align=right | 2.8 km || 
|-id=713 bgcolor=#E9E9E9
| 222713 ||  || — || January 9, 2002 || Socorro || LINEAR || — || align=right | 3.7 km || 
|-id=714 bgcolor=#E9E9E9
| 222714 ||  || — || January 9, 2002 || Socorro || LINEAR || — || align=right | 1.6 km || 
|-id=715 bgcolor=#E9E9E9
| 222715 ||  || — || January 9, 2002 || Socorro || LINEAR || — || align=right | 1.5 km || 
|-id=716 bgcolor=#E9E9E9
| 222716 ||  || — || January 9, 2002 || Socorro || LINEAR || — || align=right | 2.6 km || 
|-id=717 bgcolor=#E9E9E9
| 222717 ||  || — || January 9, 2002 || Socorro || LINEAR || — || align=right | 1.6 km || 
|-id=718 bgcolor=#E9E9E9
| 222718 ||  || — || January 11, 2002 || Socorro || LINEAR || JUN || align=right | 1.7 km || 
|-id=719 bgcolor=#E9E9E9
| 222719 ||  || — || January 12, 2002 || Palomar || NEAT || — || align=right | 1.4 km || 
|-id=720 bgcolor=#E9E9E9
| 222720 ||  || — || January 9, 2002 || Socorro || LINEAR || — || align=right | 2.2 km || 
|-id=721 bgcolor=#E9E9E9
| 222721 ||  || — || January 10, 2002 || Palomar || NEAT || — || align=right | 1.7 km || 
|-id=722 bgcolor=#E9E9E9
| 222722 ||  || — || January 14, 2002 || Socorro || LINEAR || — || align=right | 2.0 km || 
|-id=723 bgcolor=#d6d6d6
| 222723 ||  || — || January 14, 2002 || Socorro || LINEAR || 628 || align=right | 2.8 km || 
|-id=724 bgcolor=#E9E9E9
| 222724 ||  || — || January 13, 2002 || Socorro || LINEAR || — || align=right | 3.5 km || 
|-id=725 bgcolor=#E9E9E9
| 222725 ||  || — || January 13, 2002 || Socorro || LINEAR || — || align=right | 1.8 km || 
|-id=726 bgcolor=#E9E9E9
| 222726 ||  || — || January 13, 2002 || Socorro || LINEAR || — || align=right | 3.6 km || 
|-id=727 bgcolor=#E9E9E9
| 222727 ||  || — || January 13, 2002 || Socorro || LINEAR || MAR || align=right | 1.8 km || 
|-id=728 bgcolor=#E9E9E9
| 222728 ||  || — || January 14, 2002 || Socorro || LINEAR || — || align=right | 2.8 km || 
|-id=729 bgcolor=#E9E9E9
| 222729 ||  || — || January 14, 2002 || Socorro || LINEAR || — || align=right | 2.5 km || 
|-id=730 bgcolor=#E9E9E9
| 222730 ||  || — || January 14, 2002 || Socorro || LINEAR || — || align=right | 2.0 km || 
|-id=731 bgcolor=#E9E9E9
| 222731 ||  || — || January 14, 2002 || Socorro || LINEAR || — || align=right | 2.0 km || 
|-id=732 bgcolor=#E9E9E9
| 222732 ||  || — || January 5, 2002 || Palomar || NEAT || ADE || align=right | 3.8 km || 
|-id=733 bgcolor=#E9E9E9
| 222733 ||  || — || January 6, 2002 || Palomar || NEAT || — || align=right | 2.2 km || 
|-id=734 bgcolor=#E9E9E9
| 222734 ||  || — || January 8, 2002 || Socorro || LINEAR || — || align=right | 1.5 km || 
|-id=735 bgcolor=#E9E9E9
| 222735 ||  || — || January 9, 2002 || Palomar || NEAT || — || align=right | 2.2 km || 
|-id=736 bgcolor=#E9E9E9
| 222736 ||  || — || January 10, 2002 || Palomar || NEAT || — || align=right | 3.1 km || 
|-id=737 bgcolor=#E9E9E9
| 222737 ||  || — || January 11, 2002 || Kitt Peak || Spacewatch || — || align=right | 1.7 km || 
|-id=738 bgcolor=#E9E9E9
| 222738 ||  || — || January 13, 2002 || Socorro || LINEAR || — || align=right | 2.7 km || 
|-id=739 bgcolor=#E9E9E9
| 222739 ||  || — || January 13, 2002 || Kitt Peak || Spacewatch || — || align=right | 3.0 km || 
|-id=740 bgcolor=#E9E9E9
| 222740 ||  || — || January 19, 2002 || Anderson Mesa || LONEOS || EUN || align=right | 2.4 km || 
|-id=741 bgcolor=#E9E9E9
| 222741 ||  || — || January 19, 2002 || Anderson Mesa || LONEOS || BAR || align=right | 1.7 km || 
|-id=742 bgcolor=#E9E9E9
| 222742 ||  || — || January 19, 2002 || Anderson Mesa || LONEOS || — || align=right | 2.2 km || 
|-id=743 bgcolor=#E9E9E9
| 222743 ||  || — || January 18, 2002 || Socorro || LINEAR || — || align=right | 2.0 km || 
|-id=744 bgcolor=#E9E9E9
| 222744 ||  || — || January 19, 2002 || Socorro || LINEAR || — || align=right | 3.4 km || 
|-id=745 bgcolor=#E9E9E9
| 222745 ||  || — || January 19, 2002 || Socorro || LINEAR || EUN || align=right | 1.9 km || 
|-id=746 bgcolor=#E9E9E9
| 222746 ||  || — || January 23, 2002 || Socorro || LINEAR || — || align=right | 2.7 km || 
|-id=747 bgcolor=#E9E9E9
| 222747 ||  || — || January 20, 2002 || Anderson Mesa || LONEOS || — || align=right | 1.9 km || 
|-id=748 bgcolor=#E9E9E9
| 222748 ||  || — || January 21, 2002 || Anderson Mesa || LONEOS || — || align=right | 3.3 km || 
|-id=749 bgcolor=#E9E9E9
| 222749 ||  || — || February 3, 2002 || Palomar || NEAT || — || align=right | 2.1 km || 
|-id=750 bgcolor=#E9E9E9
| 222750 ||  || — || February 6, 2002 || Socorro || LINEAR || JUN || align=right | 4.0 km || 
|-id=751 bgcolor=#fefefe
| 222751 ||  || — || February 6, 2002 || Socorro || LINEAR || H || align=right data-sort-value="0.96" | 960 m || 
|-id=752 bgcolor=#E9E9E9
| 222752 ||  || — || February 6, 2002 || Socorro || LINEAR || — || align=right | 2.2 km || 
|-id=753 bgcolor=#FA8072
| 222753 ||  || — || February 10, 2002 || Fountain Hills || C. W. Juels, P. R. Holvorcem || — || align=right | 5.0 km || 
|-id=754 bgcolor=#E9E9E9
| 222754 ||  || — || February 6, 2002 || Socorro || LINEAR || — || align=right | 1.3 km || 
|-id=755 bgcolor=#E9E9E9
| 222755 ||  || — || February 6, 2002 || Socorro || LINEAR || — || align=right | 4.3 km || 
|-id=756 bgcolor=#E9E9E9
| 222756 ||  || — || February 6, 2002 || Socorro || LINEAR || — || align=right | 1.6 km || 
|-id=757 bgcolor=#E9E9E9
| 222757 ||  || — || February 11, 2002 || Desert Eagle || W. K. Y. Yeung || NEM || align=right | 3.1 km || 
|-id=758 bgcolor=#E9E9E9
| 222758 ||  || — || February 7, 2002 || Palomar || NEAT || — || align=right | 3.9 km || 
|-id=759 bgcolor=#E9E9E9
| 222759 ||  || — || February 6, 2002 || Kitt Peak || Spacewatch || — || align=right | 1.7 km || 
|-id=760 bgcolor=#E9E9E9
| 222760 ||  || — || February 3, 2002 || Haleakala || NEAT || ADE || align=right | 2.6 km || 
|-id=761 bgcolor=#E9E9E9
| 222761 ||  || — || February 6, 2002 || Socorro || LINEAR || — || align=right | 1.4 km || 
|-id=762 bgcolor=#E9E9E9
| 222762 ||  || — || February 7, 2002 || Socorro || LINEAR || — || align=right | 3.6 km || 
|-id=763 bgcolor=#E9E9E9
| 222763 ||  || — || February 6, 2002 || Socorro || LINEAR || — || align=right | 3.6 km || 
|-id=764 bgcolor=#E9E9E9
| 222764 ||  || — || February 6, 2002 || Socorro || LINEAR || — || align=right | 4.2 km || 
|-id=765 bgcolor=#E9E9E9
| 222765 ||  || — || February 7, 2002 || Socorro || LINEAR || — || align=right | 1.9 km || 
|-id=766 bgcolor=#E9E9E9
| 222766 ||  || — || February 7, 2002 || Socorro || LINEAR || — || align=right | 3.6 km || 
|-id=767 bgcolor=#E9E9E9
| 222767 ||  || — || February 7, 2002 || Socorro || LINEAR || — || align=right | 3.7 km || 
|-id=768 bgcolor=#E9E9E9
| 222768 ||  || — || February 7, 2002 || Socorro || LINEAR || — || align=right | 3.0 km || 
|-id=769 bgcolor=#E9E9E9
| 222769 ||  || — || February 7, 2002 || Socorro || LINEAR || — || align=right | 2.6 km || 
|-id=770 bgcolor=#E9E9E9
| 222770 ||  || — || February 7, 2002 || Socorro || LINEAR || — || align=right | 2.2 km || 
|-id=771 bgcolor=#E9E9E9
| 222771 ||  || — || February 7, 2002 || Socorro || LINEAR || — || align=right | 2.4 km || 
|-id=772 bgcolor=#E9E9E9
| 222772 ||  || — || February 7, 2002 || Socorro || LINEAR || — || align=right | 3.9 km || 
|-id=773 bgcolor=#C2FFFF
| 222773 ||  || — || February 7, 2002 || Socorro || LINEAR || L4 || align=right | 14 km || 
|-id=774 bgcolor=#E9E9E9
| 222774 ||  || — || February 7, 2002 || Socorro || LINEAR || — || align=right | 5.6 km || 
|-id=775 bgcolor=#E9E9E9
| 222775 ||  || — || February 7, 2002 || Socorro || LINEAR || — || align=right | 1.9 km || 
|-id=776 bgcolor=#E9E9E9
| 222776 ||  || — || February 7, 2002 || Socorro || LINEAR || — || align=right | 2.7 km || 
|-id=777 bgcolor=#d6d6d6
| 222777 ||  || — || February 7, 2002 || Socorro || LINEAR || — || align=right | 4.3 km || 
|-id=778 bgcolor=#E9E9E9
| 222778 ||  || — || February 8, 2002 || Socorro || LINEAR || GEF || align=right | 1.6 km || 
|-id=779 bgcolor=#E9E9E9
| 222779 ||  || — || February 8, 2002 || Socorro || LINEAR || AGN || align=right | 1.8 km || 
|-id=780 bgcolor=#E9E9E9
| 222780 ||  || — || February 8, 2002 || Socorro || LINEAR || JUN || align=right | 2.0 km || 
|-id=781 bgcolor=#E9E9E9
| 222781 ||  || — || February 9, 2002 || Socorro || LINEAR || MRX || align=right | 1.3 km || 
|-id=782 bgcolor=#E9E9E9
| 222782 ||  || — || February 8, 2002 || Socorro || LINEAR || — || align=right | 2.3 km || 
|-id=783 bgcolor=#E9E9E9
| 222783 ||  || — || February 8, 2002 || Socorro || LINEAR || — || align=right | 2.3 km || 
|-id=784 bgcolor=#E9E9E9
| 222784 ||  || — || February 10, 2002 || Socorro || LINEAR || — || align=right | 3.0 km || 
|-id=785 bgcolor=#C2FFFF
| 222785 ||  || — || February 10, 2002 || Socorro || LINEAR || L4 || align=right | 12 km || 
|-id=786 bgcolor=#E9E9E9
| 222786 ||  || — || February 10, 2002 || Socorro || LINEAR || — || align=right | 3.3 km || 
|-id=787 bgcolor=#E9E9E9
| 222787 ||  || — || February 10, 2002 || Socorro || LINEAR || MIS || align=right | 3.2 km || 
|-id=788 bgcolor=#E9E9E9
| 222788 ||  || — || February 10, 2002 || Socorro || LINEAR || — || align=right | 2.4 km || 
|-id=789 bgcolor=#E9E9E9
| 222789 ||  || — || February 10, 2002 || Socorro || LINEAR || — || align=right | 2.9 km || 
|-id=790 bgcolor=#C2FFFF
| 222790 ||  || — || February 10, 2002 || Socorro || LINEAR || L4 || align=right | 12 km || 
|-id=791 bgcolor=#C2FFFF
| 222791 ||  || — || February 10, 2002 || Socorro || LINEAR || L4 || align=right | 10 km || 
|-id=792 bgcolor=#E9E9E9
| 222792 ||  || — || February 10, 2002 || Socorro || LINEAR || NEM || align=right | 2.5 km || 
|-id=793 bgcolor=#E9E9E9
| 222793 ||  || — || February 10, 2002 || Socorro || LINEAR || HEN || align=right | 1.5 km || 
|-id=794 bgcolor=#d6d6d6
| 222794 ||  || — || February 10, 2002 || Socorro || LINEAR || — || align=right | 4.5 km || 
|-id=795 bgcolor=#E9E9E9
| 222795 ||  || — || February 10, 2002 || Socorro || LINEAR || HOF || align=right | 3.8 km || 
|-id=796 bgcolor=#E9E9E9
| 222796 ||  || — || February 10, 2002 || Socorro || LINEAR || — || align=right | 2.7 km || 
|-id=797 bgcolor=#E9E9E9
| 222797 ||  || — || February 10, 2002 || Socorro || LINEAR || — || align=right | 2.4 km || 
|-id=798 bgcolor=#E9E9E9
| 222798 ||  || — || February 11, 2002 || Socorro || LINEAR || — || align=right | 2.4 km || 
|-id=799 bgcolor=#E9E9E9
| 222799 ||  || — || February 6, 2002 || Palomar || NEAT || — || align=right | 2.9 km || 
|-id=800 bgcolor=#E9E9E9
| 222800 ||  || — || February 10, 2002 || Socorro || LINEAR || — || align=right | 4.4 km || 
|}

222801–222900 

|-bgcolor=#E9E9E9
| 222801 ||  || — || February 11, 2002 || Socorro || LINEAR || NEM || align=right | 3.6 km || 
|-id=802 bgcolor=#E9E9E9
| 222802 ||  || — || February 11, 2002 || Socorro || LINEAR || — || align=right | 1.9 km || 
|-id=803 bgcolor=#E9E9E9
| 222803 ||  || — || February 12, 2002 || Palomar || NEAT || — || align=right | 3.0 km || 
|-id=804 bgcolor=#E9E9E9
| 222804 ||  || — || February 8, 2002 || Socorro || LINEAR || — || align=right | 4.8 km || 
|-id=805 bgcolor=#E9E9E9
| 222805 ||  || — || February 15, 2002 || Socorro || LINEAR || — || align=right | 3.9 km || 
|-id=806 bgcolor=#E9E9E9
| 222806 ||  || — || February 4, 2002 || Anderson Mesa || LONEOS || — || align=right | 2.3 km || 
|-id=807 bgcolor=#E9E9E9
| 222807 ||  || — || February 4, 2002 || Palomar || NEAT || XIZ || align=right | 1.7 km || 
|-id=808 bgcolor=#E9E9E9
| 222808 ||  || — || February 6, 2002 || Anderson Mesa || LONEOS || — || align=right | 3.1 km || 
|-id=809 bgcolor=#E9E9E9
| 222809 ||  || — || February 6, 2002 || Palomar || NEAT || VIB || align=right | 2.8 km || 
|-id=810 bgcolor=#E9E9E9
| 222810 ||  || — || February 6, 2002 || Palomar || NEAT || NEM || align=right | 3.3 km || 
|-id=811 bgcolor=#E9E9E9
| 222811 ||  || — || February 7, 2002 || Haleakala || NEAT || — || align=right | 3.1 km || 
|-id=812 bgcolor=#E9E9E9
| 222812 ||  || — || February 7, 2002 || Kitt Peak || M. W. Buie || — || align=right | 3.0 km || 
|-id=813 bgcolor=#E9E9E9
| 222813 ||  || — || February 8, 2002 || Kitt Peak || Spacewatch || — || align=right | 2.3 km || 
|-id=814 bgcolor=#E9E9E9
| 222814 ||  || — || February 10, 2002 || Kitt Peak || Spacewatch || — || align=right | 3.7 km || 
|-id=815 bgcolor=#E9E9E9
| 222815 ||  || — || February 9, 2002 || Palomar || NEAT || — || align=right | 3.2 km || 
|-id=816 bgcolor=#E9E9E9
| 222816 ||  || — || February 10, 2002 || Socorro || LINEAR || GEF || align=right | 1.6 km || 
|-id=817 bgcolor=#E9E9E9
| 222817 ||  || — || February 10, 2002 || Socorro || LINEAR || — || align=right | 2.8 km || 
|-id=818 bgcolor=#E9E9E9
| 222818 ||  || — || February 10, 2002 || Socorro || LINEAR || — || align=right | 3.5 km || 
|-id=819 bgcolor=#E9E9E9
| 222819 ||  || — || February 11, 2002 || Socorro || LINEAR || HEN || align=right | 1.5 km || 
|-id=820 bgcolor=#E9E9E9
| 222820 ||  || — || February 15, 2002 || Socorro || LINEAR || JUN || align=right | 1.1 km || 
|-id=821 bgcolor=#C2FFFF
| 222821 ||  || — || February 13, 2002 || Kitt Peak || Spacewatch || L4 || align=right | 13 km || 
|-id=822 bgcolor=#E9E9E9
| 222822 ||  || — || February 20, 2002 || Kitt Peak || Spacewatch || HOF || align=right | 3.1 km || 
|-id=823 bgcolor=#E9E9E9
| 222823 ||  || — || February 20, 2002 || Kitt Peak || Spacewatch || — || align=right | 2.8 km || 
|-id=824 bgcolor=#E9E9E9
| 222824 ||  || — || February 19, 2002 || Socorro || LINEAR || — || align=right | 2.6 km || 
|-id=825 bgcolor=#E9E9E9
| 222825 ||  || — || February 19, 2002 || Socorro || LINEAR || — || align=right | 3.4 km || 
|-id=826 bgcolor=#C2FFFF
| 222826 ||  || — || February 22, 2002 || Palomar || NEAT || L4 || align=right | 10 km || 
|-id=827 bgcolor=#C2FFFF
| 222827 ||  || — || February 22, 2002 || Palomar || NEAT || L4 || align=right | 14 km || 
|-id=828 bgcolor=#d6d6d6
| 222828 ||  || — || March 9, 2002 || Ondřejov || P. Kušnirák || — || align=right | 3.8 km || 
|-id=829 bgcolor=#E9E9E9
| 222829 ||  || — || March 6, 2002 || Siding Spring || R. H. McNaught || WIT || align=right | 1.9 km || 
|-id=830 bgcolor=#E9E9E9
| 222830 ||  || — || March 6, 2002 || Siding Spring || Siding Spring Obs. || — || align=right | 2.8 km || 
|-id=831 bgcolor=#C2FFFF
| 222831 ||  || — || March 12, 2002 || Palomar || NEAT || L4 || align=right | 16 km || 
|-id=832 bgcolor=#E9E9E9
| 222832 ||  || — || March 14, 2002 || Desert Eagle || W. K. Y. Yeung || — || align=right | 2.0 km || 
|-id=833 bgcolor=#E9E9E9
| 222833 ||  || — || March 2, 2002 || Palomar || NEAT || — || align=right | 5.4 km || 
|-id=834 bgcolor=#E9E9E9
| 222834 ||  || — || March 5, 2002 || Kitt Peak || Spacewatch || NEM || align=right | 2.2 km || 
|-id=835 bgcolor=#E9E9E9
| 222835 ||  || — || March 9, 2002 || Kitt Peak || Spacewatch || — || align=right | 2.8 km || 
|-id=836 bgcolor=#d6d6d6
| 222836 ||  || — || March 10, 2002 || Haleakala || NEAT || — || align=right | 5.8 km || 
|-id=837 bgcolor=#E9E9E9
| 222837 ||  || — || March 9, 2002 || Socorro || LINEAR || — || align=right | 2.2 km || 
|-id=838 bgcolor=#E9E9E9
| 222838 ||  || — || March 9, 2002 || Socorro || LINEAR || — || align=right | 3.0 km || 
|-id=839 bgcolor=#E9E9E9
| 222839 ||  || — || March 9, 2002 || Kitt Peak || Spacewatch || AGN || align=right | 1.6 km || 
|-id=840 bgcolor=#C2FFFF
| 222840 ||  || — || March 13, 2002 || Socorro || LINEAR || L4 || align=right | 15 km || 
|-id=841 bgcolor=#E9E9E9
| 222841 ||  || — || March 13, 2002 || Socorro || LINEAR || — || align=right | 3.3 km || 
|-id=842 bgcolor=#d6d6d6
| 222842 ||  || — || March 11, 2002 || Kitt Peak || Spacewatch || EOS || align=right | 3.2 km || 
|-id=843 bgcolor=#C2FFFF
| 222843 ||  || — || March 12, 2002 || Palomar || NEAT || L4 || align=right | 13 km || 
|-id=844 bgcolor=#C2FFFF
| 222844 ||  || — || March 13, 2002 || Palomar || NEAT || L4 || align=right | 16 km || 
|-id=845 bgcolor=#d6d6d6
| 222845 ||  || — || March 13, 2002 || Palomar || NEAT || KOR || align=right | 2.2 km || 
|-id=846 bgcolor=#d6d6d6
| 222846 ||  || — || March 13, 2002 || Palomar || NEAT || — || align=right | 3.6 km || 
|-id=847 bgcolor=#C2FFFF
| 222847 ||  || — || March 9, 2002 || Socorro || LINEAR || L4 || align=right | 11 km || 
|-id=848 bgcolor=#E9E9E9
| 222848 ||  || — || March 14, 2002 || Socorro || LINEAR || — || align=right | 3.6 km || 
|-id=849 bgcolor=#E9E9E9
| 222849 ||  || — || March 2, 2002 || Palomar || NEAT || — || align=right | 1.7 km || 
|-id=850 bgcolor=#E9E9E9
| 222850 ||  || — || March 5, 2002 || Catalina || CSS || — || align=right | 3.2 km || 
|-id=851 bgcolor=#C2FFFF
| 222851 ||  || — || March 9, 2002 || Kitt Peak || Spacewatch || L4 || align=right | 11 km || 
|-id=852 bgcolor=#d6d6d6
| 222852 ||  || — || March 10, 2002 || Kitt Peak || Spacewatch || — || align=right | 3.2 km || 
|-id=853 bgcolor=#E9E9E9
| 222853 ||  || — || March 9, 2002 || Kitt Peak || Spacewatch || — || align=right | 1.5 km || 
|-id=854 bgcolor=#C2FFFF
| 222854 ||  || — || March 10, 2002 || Kitt Peak || Spacewatch || L4 || align=right | 11 km || 
|-id=855 bgcolor=#d6d6d6
| 222855 ||  || — || March 12, 2002 || Palomar || NEAT || — || align=right | 3.0 km || 
|-id=856 bgcolor=#E9E9E9
| 222856 ||  || — || March 12, 2002 || Palomar || NEAT || MRX || align=right | 1.5 km || 
|-id=857 bgcolor=#d6d6d6
| 222857 ||  || — || March 10, 2002 || Haleakala || NEAT || — || align=right | 3.4 km || 
|-id=858 bgcolor=#E9E9E9
| 222858 ||  || — || March 12, 2002 || Palomar || NEAT || — || align=right | 2.7 km || 
|-id=859 bgcolor=#C2FFFF
| 222859 ||  || — || March 13, 2002 || Socorro || LINEAR || L4 || align=right | 18 km || 
|-id=860 bgcolor=#E9E9E9
| 222860 ||  || — || March 12, 2002 || Kitt Peak || Spacewatch || — || align=right | 4.2 km || 
|-id=861 bgcolor=#C2FFFF
| 222861 ||  || — || March 13, 2002 || Palomar || NEAT || L4ERY || align=right | 13 km || 
|-id=862 bgcolor=#C2FFFF
| 222862 ||  || — || March 12, 2002 || Palomar || NEAT || L4 || align=right | 11 km || 
|-id=863 bgcolor=#d6d6d6
| 222863 ||  || — || March 12, 2002 || Palomar || NEAT || KOR || align=right | 2.0 km || 
|-id=864 bgcolor=#C2FFFF
| 222864 ||  || — || March 12, 2002 || Palomar || NEAT || L4 || align=right | 15 km || 
|-id=865 bgcolor=#d6d6d6
| 222865 ||  || — || March 15, 2002 || Palomar || NEAT || — || align=right | 4.0 km || 
|-id=866 bgcolor=#E9E9E9
| 222866 ||  || — || March 15, 2002 || Palomar || NEAT || — || align=right | 3.5 km || 
|-id=867 bgcolor=#E9E9E9
| 222867 ||  || — || March 14, 2002 || Socorro || LINEAR || — || align=right | 3.4 km || 
|-id=868 bgcolor=#E9E9E9
| 222868 ||  || — || March 6, 2002 || Palomar || NEAT || — || align=right | 2.0 km || 
|-id=869 bgcolor=#FFC2E0
| 222869 ||  || — || March 21, 2002 || Socorro || LINEAR || APO +1km || align=right | 1.0 km || 
|-id=870 bgcolor=#d6d6d6
| 222870 ||  || — || March 16, 2002 || Socorro || LINEAR || — || align=right | 3.6 km || 
|-id=871 bgcolor=#C2FFFF
| 222871 ||  || — || March 20, 2002 || Socorro || LINEAR || L4 || align=right | 12 km || 
|-id=872 bgcolor=#E9E9E9
| 222872 || 2002 GF || — || April 2, 2002 || Socorro || LINEAR || — || align=right | 4.0 km || 
|-id=873 bgcolor=#d6d6d6
| 222873 || 2002 GL || — || April 3, 2002 || Emerald Lane || L. Ball || KOR || align=right | 2.4 km || 
|-id=874 bgcolor=#d6d6d6
| 222874 ||  || — || April 14, 2002 || Socorro || LINEAR || EOS || align=right | 2.5 km || 
|-id=875 bgcolor=#d6d6d6
| 222875 ||  || — || April 14, 2002 || Socorro || LINEAR || — || align=right | 4.9 km || 
|-id=876 bgcolor=#d6d6d6
| 222876 ||  || — || April 4, 2002 || Palomar || NEAT || — || align=right | 4.3 km || 
|-id=877 bgcolor=#d6d6d6
| 222877 ||  || — || April 4, 2002 || Palomar || NEAT || EOS || align=right | 3.8 km || 
|-id=878 bgcolor=#d6d6d6
| 222878 ||  || — || April 4, 2002 || Palomar || NEAT || — || align=right | 4.8 km || 
|-id=879 bgcolor=#d6d6d6
| 222879 ||  || — || April 8, 2002 || Palomar || NEAT || — || align=right | 3.1 km || 
|-id=880 bgcolor=#d6d6d6
| 222880 ||  || — || April 8, 2002 || Palomar || NEAT || EOS || align=right | 3.3 km || 
|-id=881 bgcolor=#d6d6d6
| 222881 ||  || — || April 8, 2002 || Palomar || NEAT || — || align=right | 4.4 km || 
|-id=882 bgcolor=#d6d6d6
| 222882 ||  || — || April 9, 2002 || Anderson Mesa || LONEOS || — || align=right | 4.2 km || 
|-id=883 bgcolor=#d6d6d6
| 222883 ||  || — || April 10, 2002 || Socorro || LINEAR || ITH || align=right | 1.8 km || 
|-id=884 bgcolor=#d6d6d6
| 222884 ||  || — || April 10, 2002 || Socorro || LINEAR || ALA || align=right | 4.0 km || 
|-id=885 bgcolor=#d6d6d6
| 222885 ||  || — || April 8, 2002 || Palomar || NEAT || — || align=right | 4.6 km || 
|-id=886 bgcolor=#d6d6d6
| 222886 ||  || — || April 9, 2002 || Kitt Peak || Spacewatch || EOS || align=right | 2.7 km || 
|-id=887 bgcolor=#E9E9E9
| 222887 ||  || — || April 9, 2002 || Anderson Mesa || LONEOS || DOR || align=right | 3.4 km || 
|-id=888 bgcolor=#d6d6d6
| 222888 ||  || — || April 9, 2002 || Socorro || LINEAR || — || align=right | 5.6 km || 
|-id=889 bgcolor=#d6d6d6
| 222889 ||  || — || April 9, 2002 || Socorro || LINEAR || EOS || align=right | 3.0 km || 
|-id=890 bgcolor=#d6d6d6
| 222890 ||  || — || April 10, 2002 || Socorro || LINEAR || HYG || align=right | 5.2 km || 
|-id=891 bgcolor=#d6d6d6
| 222891 ||  || — || April 10, 2002 || Socorro || LINEAR || — || align=right | 4.1 km || 
|-id=892 bgcolor=#d6d6d6
| 222892 ||  || — || April 11, 2002 || Socorro || LINEAR || — || align=right | 4.6 km || 
|-id=893 bgcolor=#d6d6d6
| 222893 ||  || — || April 12, 2002 || Socorro || LINEAR || — || align=right | 2.7 km || 
|-id=894 bgcolor=#E9E9E9
| 222894 ||  || — || April 12, 2002 || Socorro || LINEAR || — || align=right | 3.7 km || 
|-id=895 bgcolor=#d6d6d6
| 222895 ||  || — || April 12, 2002 || Kitt Peak || Spacewatch || — || align=right | 5.5 km || 
|-id=896 bgcolor=#d6d6d6
| 222896 ||  || — || April 13, 2002 || Kitt Peak || Spacewatch || KOR || align=right | 2.0 km || 
|-id=897 bgcolor=#d6d6d6
| 222897 ||  || — || April 14, 2002 || Palomar || NEAT || — || align=right | 4.1 km || 
|-id=898 bgcolor=#d6d6d6
| 222898 ||  || — || April 14, 2002 || Palomar || NEAT || 629 || align=right | 2.1 km || 
|-id=899 bgcolor=#d6d6d6
| 222899 ||  || — || April 9, 2002 || Socorro || LINEAR || — || align=right | 3.6 km || 
|-id=900 bgcolor=#fefefe
| 222900 ||  || — || April 8, 2002 || Palomar || NEAT || — || align=right data-sort-value="0.83" | 830 m || 
|}

222901–223000 

|-bgcolor=#d6d6d6
| 222901 ||  || — || April 8, 2002 || Palomar || NEAT || — || align=right | 3.1 km || 
|-id=902 bgcolor=#d6d6d6
| 222902 ||  || — || April 3, 2002 || Kitt Peak || Spacewatch || THM || align=right | 3.2 km || 
|-id=903 bgcolor=#d6d6d6
| 222903 ||  || — || April 6, 2002 || Cerro Tololo || M. W. Buie || — || align=right | 4.3 km || 
|-id=904 bgcolor=#d6d6d6
| 222904 ||  || — || April 8, 2002 || Kitt Peak || Spacewatch || — || align=right | 4.1 km || 
|-id=905 bgcolor=#d6d6d6
| 222905 ||  || — || April 16, 2002 || Socorro || LINEAR || — || align=right | 3.3 km || 
|-id=906 bgcolor=#d6d6d6
| 222906 ||  || — || April 18, 2002 || Palomar || NEAT || — || align=right | 5.2 km || 
|-id=907 bgcolor=#d6d6d6
| 222907 ||  || — || April 18, 2002 || Palomar || NEAT || TIR || align=right | 6.3 km || 
|-id=908 bgcolor=#d6d6d6
| 222908 ||  || — || April 18, 2002 || Palomar || NEAT || THM || align=right | 3.1 km || 
|-id=909 bgcolor=#d6d6d6
| 222909 ||  || — || May 4, 2002 || Desert Eagle || W. K. Y. Yeung || — || align=right | 4.4 km || 
|-id=910 bgcolor=#d6d6d6
| 222910 ||  || — || May 9, 2002 || Socorro || LINEAR || HYG || align=right | 4.0 km || 
|-id=911 bgcolor=#d6d6d6
| 222911 ||  || — || May 9, 2002 || Socorro || LINEAR || — || align=right | 5.4 km || 
|-id=912 bgcolor=#d6d6d6
| 222912 ||  || — || May 9, 2002 || Socorro || LINEAR || — || align=right | 4.2 km || 
|-id=913 bgcolor=#fefefe
| 222913 ||  || — || May 10, 2002 || Socorro || LINEAR || — || align=right data-sort-value="0.77" | 770 m || 
|-id=914 bgcolor=#d6d6d6
| 222914 ||  || — || May 11, 2002 || Socorro || LINEAR || — || align=right | 4.5 km || 
|-id=915 bgcolor=#d6d6d6
| 222915 ||  || — || May 11, 2002 || Socorro || LINEAR || — || align=right | 4.8 km || 
|-id=916 bgcolor=#d6d6d6
| 222916 ||  || — || May 11, 2002 || Socorro || LINEAR || — || align=right | 4.8 km || 
|-id=917 bgcolor=#d6d6d6
| 222917 ||  || — || May 13, 2002 || Socorro || LINEAR || — || align=right | 5.5 km || 
|-id=918 bgcolor=#d6d6d6
| 222918 ||  || — || May 12, 2002 || Socorro || LINEAR || — || align=right | 4.0 km || 
|-id=919 bgcolor=#fefefe
| 222919 ||  || — || May 6, 2002 || Socorro || LINEAR || — || align=right | 1.7 km || 
|-id=920 bgcolor=#d6d6d6
| 222920 ||  || — || May 11, 2002 || Socorro || LINEAR || EOS || align=right | 2.8 km || 
|-id=921 bgcolor=#d6d6d6
| 222921 ||  || — || May 13, 2002 || Palomar || NEAT || — || align=right | 5.6 km || 
|-id=922 bgcolor=#fefefe
| 222922 ||  || — || May 9, 2002 || Socorro || LINEAR || — || align=right | 1.1 km || 
|-id=923 bgcolor=#d6d6d6
| 222923 ||  || — || May 1, 2002 || Palomar || NEAT || EOS || align=right | 2.7 km || 
|-id=924 bgcolor=#d6d6d6
| 222924 ||  || — || June 7, 2002 || Palomar || NEAT || — || align=right | 4.2 km || 
|-id=925 bgcolor=#d6d6d6
| 222925 ||  || — || June 11, 2002 || Fountain Hills || C. W. Juels, P. R. Holvorcem || EUP || align=right | 7.4 km || 
|-id=926 bgcolor=#d6d6d6
| 222926 ||  || — || June 5, 2002 || Anderson Mesa || LONEOS || — || align=right | 4.8 km || 
|-id=927 bgcolor=#d6d6d6
| 222927 ||  || — || June 9, 2002 || Palomar || NEAT || — || align=right | 5.4 km || 
|-id=928 bgcolor=#d6d6d6
| 222928 ||  || — || June 10, 2002 || Socorro || LINEAR || — || align=right | 5.2 km || 
|-id=929 bgcolor=#fefefe
| 222929 ||  || — || June 6, 2002 || Kitt Peak || Spacewatch || — || align=right data-sort-value="0.86" | 860 m || 
|-id=930 bgcolor=#fefefe
| 222930 ||  || — || June 23, 2002 || Palomar || NEAT || — || align=right data-sort-value="0.92" | 920 m || 
|-id=931 bgcolor=#FA8072
| 222931 ||  || — || July 9, 2002 || Socorro || LINEAR || fast? || align=right data-sort-value="0.93" | 930 m || 
|-id=932 bgcolor=#fefefe
| 222932 ||  || — || July 4, 2002 || Palomar || NEAT || — || align=right | 1.0 km || 
|-id=933 bgcolor=#fefefe
| 222933 ||  || — || July 9, 2002 || Socorro || LINEAR || FLO || align=right data-sort-value="0.91" | 910 m || 
|-id=934 bgcolor=#fefefe
| 222934 ||  || — || July 6, 2002 || Palomar || NEAT || — || align=right | 1.1 km || 
|-id=935 bgcolor=#fefefe
| 222935 ||  || — || July 8, 2002 || Palomar || NEAT || FLO || align=right data-sort-value="0.79" | 790 m || 
|-id=936 bgcolor=#fefefe
| 222936 || 2002 OX || — || July 17, 2002 || Socorro || LINEAR || — || align=right data-sort-value="0.98" | 980 m || 
|-id=937 bgcolor=#d6d6d6
| 222937 ||  || — || July 20, 2002 || Palomar || NEAT || — || align=right | 3.6 km || 
|-id=938 bgcolor=#fefefe
| 222938 ||  || — || July 21, 2002 || Palomar || NEAT || — || align=right | 1.1 km || 
|-id=939 bgcolor=#fefefe
| 222939 ||  || — || July 21, 2002 || Palomar || NEAT || FLO || align=right data-sort-value="0.79" | 790 m || 
|-id=940 bgcolor=#fefefe
| 222940 ||  || — || July 23, 2002 || Palomar || NEAT || — || align=right | 1.2 km || 
|-id=941 bgcolor=#fefefe
| 222941 ||  || — || July 16, 2002 || Palomar || NEAT || — || align=right | 1.0 km || 
|-id=942 bgcolor=#fefefe
| 222942 ||  || — || July 19, 2002 || Palomar || NEAT || — || align=right data-sort-value="0.71" | 710 m || 
|-id=943 bgcolor=#fefefe
| 222943 ||  || — || August 4, 2002 || Palomar || NEAT || — || align=right | 1.0 km || 
|-id=944 bgcolor=#fefefe
| 222944 ||  || — || August 5, 2002 || Campo Imperatore || CINEOS || — || align=right | 1.2 km || 
|-id=945 bgcolor=#fefefe
| 222945 ||  || — || August 6, 2002 || Palomar || NEAT || — || align=right | 1.2 km || 
|-id=946 bgcolor=#fefefe
| 222946 ||  || — || August 6, 2002 || Palomar || NEAT || — || align=right | 1.1 km || 
|-id=947 bgcolor=#fefefe
| 222947 ||  || — || August 6, 2002 || Palomar || NEAT || — || align=right | 1.2 km || 
|-id=948 bgcolor=#fefefe
| 222948 ||  || — || August 10, 2002 || Socorro || LINEAR || — || align=right | 1.3 km || 
|-id=949 bgcolor=#fefefe
| 222949 ||  || — || August 9, 2002 || Socorro || LINEAR || — || align=right | 1.6 km || 
|-id=950 bgcolor=#fefefe
| 222950 ||  || — || August 12, 2002 || Socorro || LINEAR || — || align=right data-sort-value="0.87" | 870 m || 
|-id=951 bgcolor=#d6d6d6
| 222951 ||  || — || August 14, 2002 || Socorro || LINEAR || — || align=right | 6.8 km || 
|-id=952 bgcolor=#fefefe
| 222952 ||  || — || August 13, 2002 || Socorro || LINEAR || FLO || align=right data-sort-value="0.75" | 750 m || 
|-id=953 bgcolor=#fefefe
| 222953 ||  || — || August 13, 2002 || Socorro || LINEAR || — || align=right | 1.8 km || 
|-id=954 bgcolor=#fefefe
| 222954 ||  || — || August 13, 2002 || Anderson Mesa || LONEOS || — || align=right | 1.0 km || 
|-id=955 bgcolor=#fefefe
| 222955 ||  || — || August 13, 2002 || Anderson Mesa || LONEOS || FLO || align=right data-sort-value="0.83" | 830 m || 
|-id=956 bgcolor=#FA8072
| 222956 ||  || — || August 14, 2002 || Socorro || LINEAR || — || align=right | 1.1 km || 
|-id=957 bgcolor=#fefefe
| 222957 ||  || — || August 8, 2002 || Palomar || S. F. Hönig || — || align=right | 1.1 km || 
|-id=958 bgcolor=#fefefe
| 222958 ||  || — || August 15, 2002 || Anderson Mesa || LONEOS || — || align=right data-sort-value="0.95" | 950 m || 
|-id=959 bgcolor=#fefefe
| 222959 ||  || — || August 11, 2002 || Palomar || NEAT || FLO || align=right data-sort-value="0.88" | 880 m || 
|-id=960 bgcolor=#fefefe
| 222960 ||  || — || August 27, 2002 || Socorro || LINEAR || PHO || align=right | 2.2 km || 
|-id=961 bgcolor=#fefefe
| 222961 ||  || — || August 27, 2002 || Palomar || NEAT || — || align=right data-sort-value="0.90" | 900 m || 
|-id=962 bgcolor=#fefefe
| 222962 ||  || — || August 28, 2002 || Palomar || NEAT || V || align=right data-sort-value="0.85" | 850 m || 
|-id=963 bgcolor=#fefefe
| 222963 ||  || — || August 29, 2002 || Palomar || NEAT || — || align=right data-sort-value="0.82" | 820 m || 
|-id=964 bgcolor=#fefefe
| 222964 ||  || — || August 29, 2002 || Palomar || NEAT || — || align=right | 1.2 km || 
|-id=965 bgcolor=#fefefe
| 222965 ||  || — || August 30, 2002 || Kitt Peak || Spacewatch || — || align=right | 1.2 km || 
|-id=966 bgcolor=#fefefe
| 222966 ||  || — || August 29, 2002 || Palomar || S. F. Hönig || FLO || align=right data-sort-value="0.91" | 910 m || 
|-id=967 bgcolor=#fefefe
| 222967 ||  || — || August 30, 2002 || Palomar || NEAT || — || align=right | 1.1 km || 
|-id=968 bgcolor=#fefefe
| 222968 ||  || — || August 19, 2002 || Palomar || NEAT || FLO || align=right data-sort-value="0.81" | 810 m || 
|-id=969 bgcolor=#fefefe
| 222969 ||  || — || August 29, 2002 || Palomar || NEAT || — || align=right data-sort-value="0.94" | 940 m || 
|-id=970 bgcolor=#fefefe
| 222970 ||  || — || August 18, 2002 || Palomar || NEAT || — || align=right | 1.8 km || 
|-id=971 bgcolor=#fefefe
| 222971 ||  || — || August 29, 2002 || Palomar || NEAT || — || align=right data-sort-value="0.78" | 780 m || 
|-id=972 bgcolor=#fefefe
| 222972 ||  || — || August 17, 2002 || Palomar || NEAT || — || align=right data-sort-value="0.89" | 890 m || 
|-id=973 bgcolor=#fefefe
| 222973 ||  || — || August 16, 2002 || Palomar || NEAT || — || align=right | 1.1 km || 
|-id=974 bgcolor=#fefefe
| 222974 ||  || — || August 18, 2002 || Palomar || NEAT || NYSfast? || align=right data-sort-value="0.70" | 700 m || 
|-id=975 bgcolor=#d6d6d6
| 222975 ||  || — || August 17, 2002 || Palomar || NEAT || SYL7:4 || align=right | 5.6 km || 
|-id=976 bgcolor=#fefefe
| 222976 ||  || — || August 19, 2002 || Palomar || NEAT || NYS || align=right data-sort-value="0.69" | 690 m || 
|-id=977 bgcolor=#fefefe
| 222977 ||  || — || September 4, 2002 || Anderson Mesa || LONEOS || — || align=right data-sort-value="0.92" | 920 m || 
|-id=978 bgcolor=#fefefe
| 222978 ||  || — || September 4, 2002 || Anderson Mesa || LONEOS || — || align=right | 1.0 km || 
|-id=979 bgcolor=#fefefe
| 222979 ||  || — || September 4, 2002 || Palomar || NEAT || — || align=right | 1.0 km || 
|-id=980 bgcolor=#fefefe
| 222980 ||  || — || September 4, 2002 || Anderson Mesa || LONEOS || V || align=right data-sort-value="0.85" | 850 m || 
|-id=981 bgcolor=#fefefe
| 222981 ||  || — || September 5, 2002 || Socorro || LINEAR || — || align=right | 1.1 km || 
|-id=982 bgcolor=#fefefe
| 222982 ||  || — || September 5, 2002 || Socorro || LINEAR || — || align=right | 1.3 km || 
|-id=983 bgcolor=#fefefe
| 222983 ||  || — || September 5, 2002 || Socorro || LINEAR || — || align=right | 1.1 km || 
|-id=984 bgcolor=#fefefe
| 222984 ||  || — || September 5, 2002 || Socorro || LINEAR || — || align=right | 1.0 km || 
|-id=985 bgcolor=#fefefe
| 222985 ||  || — || September 5, 2002 || Socorro || LINEAR || — || align=right data-sort-value="0.80" | 800 m || 
|-id=986 bgcolor=#fefefe
| 222986 ||  || — || September 5, 2002 || Anderson Mesa || LONEOS || FLO || align=right | 1.4 km || 
|-id=987 bgcolor=#fefefe
| 222987 ||  || — || September 5, 2002 || Socorro || LINEAR || NYS || align=right data-sort-value="0.82" | 820 m || 
|-id=988 bgcolor=#fefefe
| 222988 ||  || — || September 4, 2002 || Anderson Mesa || LONEOS || NYS || align=right | 2.1 km || 
|-id=989 bgcolor=#fefefe
| 222989 ||  || — || September 5, 2002 || Socorro || LINEAR || — || align=right data-sort-value="0.98" | 980 m || 
|-id=990 bgcolor=#fefefe
| 222990 ||  || — || September 5, 2002 || Socorro || LINEAR || — || align=right | 1.3 km || 
|-id=991 bgcolor=#fefefe
| 222991 ||  || — || September 5, 2002 || Socorro || LINEAR || FLO || align=right data-sort-value="0.84" | 840 m || 
|-id=992 bgcolor=#fefefe
| 222992 ||  || — || September 5, 2002 || Haleakala || NEAT || — || align=right | 1.0 km || 
|-id=993 bgcolor=#fefefe
| 222993 ||  || — || September 10, 2002 || Palomar || NEAT || PHO || align=right | 1.5 km || 
|-id=994 bgcolor=#fefefe
| 222994 ||  || — || September 12, 2002 || Palomar || NEAT || — || align=right | 1.4 km || 
|-id=995 bgcolor=#fefefe
| 222995 ||  || — || September 12, 2002 || Palomar || NEAT || V || align=right data-sort-value="0.87" | 870 m || 
|-id=996 bgcolor=#fefefe
| 222996 ||  || — || September 12, 2002 || Palomar || NEAT || V || align=right | 1.1 km || 
|-id=997 bgcolor=#fefefe
| 222997 ||  || — || September 11, 2002 || Palomar || NEAT || FLO || align=right data-sort-value="0.70" | 700 m || 
|-id=998 bgcolor=#fefefe
| 222998 ||  || — || September 11, 2002 || Palomar || NEAT || — || align=right | 1.2 km || 
|-id=999 bgcolor=#fefefe
| 222999 ||  || — || September 12, 2002 || Palomar || NEAT || — || align=right data-sort-value="0.92" | 920 m || 
|-id=000 bgcolor=#fefefe
| 223000 ||  || — || September 13, 2002 || Kitt Peak || Spacewatch || — || align=right | 1.1 km || 
|}

References

External links 
 Discovery Circumstances: Numbered Minor Planets (220001)–(225000) (IAU Minor Planet Center)

0222